

31001–31100 

|-bgcolor=#d6d6d6
| 31001 ||  || — || November 15, 1995 || Kitt Peak || Spacewatch || — || align=right | 5.4 km || 
|-id=002 bgcolor=#d6d6d6
| 31002 ||  || — || November 15, 1995 || Kitt Peak || Spacewatch || — || align=right | 8.1 km || 
|-id=003 bgcolor=#d6d6d6
| 31003 ||  || — || November 16, 1995 || Kushiro || S. Ueda, H. Kaneda || URS || align=right | 9.8 km || 
|-id=004 bgcolor=#d6d6d6
| 31004 ||  || — || November 19, 1995 || Kitt Peak || Spacewatch || — || align=right | 9.8 km || 
|-id=005 bgcolor=#d6d6d6
| 31005 ||  || — || November 19, 1995 || Kitt Peak || Spacewatch || — || align=right | 9.6 km || 
|-id=006 bgcolor=#d6d6d6
| 31006 || 1995 XC || — || December 3, 1995 || Sudbury || D. di Cicco || — || align=right | 16 km || 
|-id=007 bgcolor=#fefefe
| 31007 ||  || — || January 15, 1996 || Kitt Peak || Spacewatch || FLO || align=right | 3.0 km || 
|-id=008 bgcolor=#fefefe
| 31008 ||  || — || January 26, 1996 || Oizumi || T. Kobayashi || — || align=right | 3.0 km || 
|-id=009 bgcolor=#d6d6d6
| 31009 || 1996 CP || — || February 1, 1996 || Xinglong || SCAP || — || align=right | 9.8 km || 
|-id=010 bgcolor=#fefefe
| 31010 ||  || — || February 11, 1996 || Oizumi || T. Kobayashi || — || align=right | 1.9 km || 
|-id=011 bgcolor=#fefefe
| 31011 ||  || — || February 2, 1996 || Xinglong || SCAP || — || align=right | 2.3 km || 
|-id=012 bgcolor=#fefefe
| 31012 Jiangshiyang ||  ||  || February 10, 1996 || Xinglong || SCAP || — || align=right | 2.5 km || 
|-id=013 bgcolor=#fefefe
| 31013 || 1996 DR || — || February 19, 1996 || Oizumi || T. Kobayashi || slow? || align=right | 3.1 km || 
|-id=014 bgcolor=#fefefe
| 31014 || 1996 DW || — || February 21, 1996 || Oizumi || T. Kobayashi || — || align=right | 2.5 km || 
|-id=015 bgcolor=#fefefe
| 31015 Boccardi ||  ||  || February 16, 1996 || Bologna || San Vittore Obs. || FLO || align=right | 1.5 km || 
|-id=016 bgcolor=#fefefe
| 31016 ||  || — || February 23, 1996 || Oizumi || T. Kobayashi || — || align=right | 5.4 km || 
|-id=017 bgcolor=#fefefe
| 31017 ||  || — || March 15, 1996 || Siding Spring || R. H. McNaught || — || align=right | 3.5 km || 
|-id=018 bgcolor=#fefefe
| 31018 ||  || — || March 15, 1996 || Haleakala || NEAT || — || align=right | 2.2 km || 
|-id=019 bgcolor=#fefefe
| 31019 ||  || — || March 12, 1996 || Kitt Peak || Spacewatch || NYS || align=right | 1.8 km || 
|-id=020 bgcolor=#d6d6d6
| 31020 Skarupa ||  ||  || March 17, 1996 || Haleakala || AMOS || 3:2 || align=right | 13 km || 
|-id=021 bgcolor=#fefefe
| 31021 ||  || — || March 17, 1996 || Haleakala || NEAT || EUT || align=right | 2.9 km || 
|-id=022 bgcolor=#fefefe
| 31022 ||  || — || March 20, 1996 || Kitt Peak || Spacewatch || — || align=right | 6.8 km || 
|-id=023 bgcolor=#fefefe
| 31023 ||  || — || March 20, 1996 || Kitt Peak || Spacewatch || — || align=right | 2.0 km || 
|-id=024 bgcolor=#fefefe
| 31024 ||  || — || March 22, 1996 || Kitt Peak || Spacewatch || — || align=right | 4.4 km || 
|-id=025 bgcolor=#fefefe
| 31025 || 1996 GR || — || April 12, 1996 || Oizumi || T. Kobayashi || — || align=right | 2.5 km || 
|-id=026 bgcolor=#fefefe
| 31026 ||  || — || April 12, 1996 || Kitt Peak || Spacewatch || — || align=right | 2.0 km || 
|-id=027 bgcolor=#fefefe
| 31027 || 1996 HQ || — || April 18, 1996 || Ondřejov || L. Kotková || — || align=right | 1.6 km || 
|-id=028 bgcolor=#fefefe
| 31028 Cerulli ||  ||  || April 18, 1996 || Bologna || San Vittore Obs. || — || align=right | 2.4 km || 
|-id=029 bgcolor=#fefefe
| 31029 ||  || — || April 18, 1996 || La Silla || E. W. Elst || FLO || align=right | 2.4 km || 
|-id=030 bgcolor=#fefefe
| 31030 ||  || — || April 18, 1996 || La Silla || E. W. Elst || V || align=right | 3.2 km || 
|-id=031 bgcolor=#fefefe
| 31031 Altiplano ||  ||  || April 18, 1996 || La Silla || E. W. Elst || NYS || align=right | 2.4 km || 
|-id=032 bgcolor=#fefefe
| 31032 Scheidemann ||  ||  || April 20, 1996 || La Silla || E. W. Elst || — || align=right | 1.9 km || 
|-id=033 bgcolor=#E9E9E9
| 31033 ||  || — || April 20, 1996 || La Silla || E. W. Elst || — || align=right | 4.0 km || 
|-id=034 bgcolor=#fefefe
| 31034 ||  || — || April 20, 1996 || La Silla || E. W. Elst || — || align=right | 2.9 km || 
|-id=035 bgcolor=#fefefe
| 31035 ||  || — || April 20, 1996 || La Silla || E. W. Elst || — || align=right | 4.1 km || 
|-id=036 bgcolor=#fefefe
| 31036 ||  || — || April 20, 1996 || La Silla || E. W. Elst || — || align=right | 3.6 km || 
|-id=037 bgcolor=#C2FFFF
| 31037 Mydon ||  ||  || April 20, 1996 || La Silla || E. W. Elst || L5 || align=right | 19 km || 
|-id=038 bgcolor=#fefefe
| 31038 ||  || — || April 20, 1996 || La Silla || E. W. Elst || — || align=right | 2.5 km || 
|-id=039 bgcolor=#fefefe
| 31039 || 1996 JN || — || May 12, 1996 || Moriyama || Y. Ikari || FLO || align=right | 3.4 km || 
|-id=040 bgcolor=#fefefe
| 31040 ||  || — || May 12, 1996 || Kitt Peak || Spacewatch || V || align=right | 1.7 km || 
|-id=041 bgcolor=#fefefe
| 31041 || 1996 KD || — || May 16, 1996 || Višnjan Observatory || Višnjan Obs. || NYS || align=right | 7.0 km || 
|-id=042 bgcolor=#fefefe
| 31042 ||  || — || May 22, 1996 || La Silla || E. W. Elst || NYS || align=right | 1.8 km || 
|-id=043 bgcolor=#E9E9E9
| 31043 Sturm || 1996 LT ||  || June 11, 1996 || Prescott || P. G. Comba || RAF || align=right | 1.7 km || 
|-id=044 bgcolor=#fefefe
| 31044 || 1996 NY || — || July 11, 1996 || Siding Spring || R. H. McNaught || — || align=right | 4.5 km || 
|-id=045 bgcolor=#E9E9E9
| 31045 ||  || — || July 14, 1996 || La Silla || E. W. Elst || — || align=right | 4.6 km || 
|-id=046 bgcolor=#E9E9E9
| 31046 ||  || — || July 14, 1996 || La Silla || E. W. Elst || — || align=right | 3.4 km || 
|-id=047 bgcolor=#E9E9E9
| 31047 ||  || — || August 8, 1996 || La Silla || E. W. Elst || EUN || align=right | 3.9 km || 
|-id=048 bgcolor=#E9E9E9
| 31048 ||  || — || August 11, 1996 || Burlington || T. Handley || EUN || align=right | 5.1 km || 
|-id=049 bgcolor=#E9E9E9
| 31049 || 1996 QZ || — || August 20, 1996 || Kleť || Kleť Obs. || — || align=right | 4.2 km || 
|-id=050 bgcolor=#d6d6d6
| 31050 ||  || — || September 12, 1996 || Haleakala || NEAT || KOR || align=right | 5.1 km || 
|-id=051 bgcolor=#E9E9E9
| 31051 ||  || — || September 13, 1996 || Haleakala || NEAT || MAR || align=right | 3.4 km || 
|-id=052 bgcolor=#d6d6d6
| 31052 ||  || — || September 10, 1996 || Haleakala || NEAT || KOR || align=right | 5.0 km || 
|-id=053 bgcolor=#E9E9E9
| 31053 ||  || — || September 11, 1996 || Haleakala || NEAT || — || align=right | 4.6 km || 
|-id=054 bgcolor=#E9E9E9
| 31054 ||  || — || September 13, 1996 || Lime Creek || R. Linderholm || — || align=right | 4.5 km || 
|-id=055 bgcolor=#d6d6d6
| 31055 ||  || — || September 8, 1996 || Kitt Peak || Spacewatch || — || align=right | 3.8 km || 
|-id=056 bgcolor=#E9E9E9
| 31056 ||  || — || September 12, 1996 || Kitt Peak || Spacewatch || MAR || align=right | 4.9 km || 
|-id=057 bgcolor=#E9E9E9
| 31057 ||  || — || September 21, 1996 || Xinglong || SCAP || MAR || align=right | 5.2 km || 
|-id=058 bgcolor=#E9E9E9
| 31058 ||  || — || October 8, 1996 || Sudbury || D. di Cicco || — || align=right | 5.9 km || 
|-id=059 bgcolor=#E9E9E9
| 31059 ||  || — || October 1, 1996 || Granville || R. G. Davis || EUN || align=right | 4.2 km || 
|-id=060 bgcolor=#E9E9E9
| 31060 ||  || — || October 3, 1996 || Xinglong || SCAP || — || align=right | 10 km || 
|-id=061 bgcolor=#d6d6d6
| 31061 Tamao ||  ||  || October 10, 1996 || Kuma Kogen || A. Nakamura || — || align=right | 5.2 km || 
|-id=062 bgcolor=#d6d6d6
| 31062 ||  || — || October 9, 1996 || Kushiro || S. Ueda, H. Kaneda || EOS || align=right | 13 km || 
|-id=063 bgcolor=#d6d6d6
| 31063 ||  || — || October 11, 1996 || Kitami || K. Endate || — || align=right | 5.3 km || 
|-id=064 bgcolor=#d6d6d6
| 31064 ||  || — || October 11, 1996 || Haleakala || NEAT || SAN || align=right | 3.8 km || 
|-id=065 bgcolor=#E9E9E9
| 31065 Beishizhang ||  ||  || October 10, 1996 || Xinglong || SCAP || NEM || align=right | 3.7 km || 
|-id=066 bgcolor=#E9E9E9
| 31066 ||  || — || October 6, 1996 || Kitt Peak || Spacewatch || — || align=right | 4.5 km || 
|-id=067 bgcolor=#E9E9E9
| 31067 ||  || — || October 4, 1996 || La Silla || E. W. Elst || — || align=right | 6.9 km || 
|-id=068 bgcolor=#E9E9E9
| 31068 ||  || — || October 9, 1996 || Xinglong || SCAP || HNSslow || align=right | 5.3 km || 
|-id=069 bgcolor=#E9E9E9
| 31069 ||  || — || October 18, 1996 || Haleakala || NEAT || — || align=right | 2.6 km || 
|-id=070 bgcolor=#d6d6d6
| 31070 ||  || — || November 3, 1996 || Kitt Peak || Spacewatch || — || align=right | 6.8 km || 
|-id=071 bgcolor=#d6d6d6
| 31071 ||  || — || November 6, 1996 || Kitt Peak || Spacewatch || EOS || align=right | 5.8 km || 
|-id=072 bgcolor=#d6d6d6
| 31072 ||  || — || November 9, 1996 || Kitt Peak || Spacewatch || CHA || align=right | 4.9 km || 
|-id=073 bgcolor=#d6d6d6
| 31073 ||  || — || November 7, 1996 || Kushiro || S. Ueda, H. Kaneda || — || align=right | 8.8 km || 
|-id=074 bgcolor=#E9E9E9
| 31074 ||  || — || November 24, 1996 || Xinglong || SCAP || — || align=right | 3.9 km || 
|-id=075 bgcolor=#d6d6d6
| 31075 || 1996 XV || — || December 1, 1996 || Chichibu || N. Satō || — || align=right | 7.0 km || 
|-id=076 bgcolor=#FA8072
| 31076 ||  || — || December 2, 1996 || Oizumi || T. Kobayashi || Hslow || align=right | 2.2 km || 
|-id=077 bgcolor=#d6d6d6
| 31077 ||  || — || December 3, 1996 || Oizumi || T. Kobayashi || — || align=right | 9.5 km || 
|-id=078 bgcolor=#d6d6d6
| 31078 ||  || — || December 6, 1996 || Oizumi || T. Kobayashi || — || align=right | 11 km || 
|-id=079 bgcolor=#d6d6d6
| 31079 ||  || — || December 7, 1996 || Oizumi || T. Kobayashi || HYG || align=right | 7.7 km || 
|-id=080 bgcolor=#d6d6d6
| 31080 ||  || — || December 7, 1996 || Oizumi || T. Kobayashi || — || align=right | 9.5 km || 
|-id=081 bgcolor=#d6d6d6
| 31081 ||  || — || December 9, 1996 || Sudbury || D. di Cicco || — || align=right | 9.3 km || 
|-id=082 bgcolor=#d6d6d6
| 31082 ||  || — || December 8, 1996 || Oizumi || T. Kobayashi || EOS || align=right | 5.0 km || 
|-id=083 bgcolor=#d6d6d6
| 31083 ||  || — || December 14, 1996 || Chichibu || N. Satō || — || align=right | 7.8 km || 
|-id=084 bgcolor=#d6d6d6
| 31084 ||  || — || December 29, 1996 || Chichibu || N. Satō || THM || align=right | 6.1 km || 
|-id=085 bgcolor=#d6d6d6
| 31085 ||  || — || January 10, 1997 || Oizumi || T. Kobayashi || — || align=right | 9.2 km || 
|-id=086 bgcolor=#d6d6d6
| 31086 Gehringer ||  ||  || January 12, 1997 || Goodricke-Pigott || R. A. Tucker || — || align=right | 5.5 km || 
|-id=087 bgcolor=#d6d6d6
| 31087 Oirase ||  ||  || January 9, 1997 || Chichibu || N. Satō || EOS || align=right | 6.3 km || 
|-id=088 bgcolor=#d6d6d6
| 31088 || 1997 BV || — || January 18, 1997 || Xinglong || SCAP || — || align=right | 6.2 km || 
|-id=089 bgcolor=#d6d6d6
| 31089 ||  || — || January 29, 1997 || Oizumi || T. Kobayashi || — || align=right | 5.6 km || 
|-id=090 bgcolor=#d6d6d6
| 31090 ||  || — || January 31, 1997 || Kitt Peak || Spacewatch || — || align=right | 12 km || 
|-id=091 bgcolor=#fefefe
| 31091 Bettiventicinque ||  ||  || January 30, 1997 || Cima Ekar || U. Munari, M. Tombelli || Hslow || align=right | 1.5 km || 
|-id=092 bgcolor=#d6d6d6
| 31092 Carolowilhelmina ||  ||  || February 6, 1997 || Kleť || M. Tichý, Z. Moravec || — || align=right | 4.6 km || 
|-id=093 bgcolor=#d6d6d6
| 31093 ||  || — || February 6, 1997 || Xinglong || SCAP || THM || align=right | 9.4 km || 
|-id=094 bgcolor=#d6d6d6
| 31094 ||  || — || February 14, 1997 || Xinglong || SCAP || 7:4 || align=right | 10 km || 
|-id=095 bgcolor=#d6d6d6
| 31095 Buneiou || 1997 DH ||  || February 27, 1997 || Chichibu || N. Satō || EOS || align=right | 6.1 km || 
|-id=096 bgcolor=#d6d6d6
| 31096 ||  || — || April 3, 1997 || Socorro || LINEAR || — || align=right | 11 km || 
|-id=097 bgcolor=#d6d6d6
| 31097 Nucciomula ||  ||  || May 3, 1997 || La Silla || E. W. Elst || 3:2 || align=right | 15 km || 
|-id=098 bgcolor=#FA8072
| 31098 Frankhill ||  ||  || June 9, 1997 || Goodricke-Pigott || R. A. Tucker || PHO || align=right | 2.8 km || 
|-id=099 bgcolor=#fefefe
| 31099 ||  || — || June 28, 1997 || Socorro || LINEAR || NYS || align=right | 2.0 km || 
|-id=100 bgcolor=#fefefe
| 31100 ||  || — || June 28, 1997 || Socorro || LINEAR || V || align=right | 2.6 km || 
|}

31101–31200 

|-bgcolor=#fefefe
| 31101 ||  || — || July 2, 1997 || Kitt Peak || Spacewatch || NYS || align=right | 1.8 km || 
|-id=102 bgcolor=#fefefe
| 31102 ||  || — || July 4, 1997 || Majorca || R. Pacheco, Á. López J. || FLO || align=right | 2.2 km || 
|-id=103 bgcolor=#fefefe
| 31103 ||  || — || July 29, 1997 || Majorca || Á. López J., R. Pacheco || ERI || align=right | 3.4 km || 
|-id=104 bgcolor=#fefefe
| 31104 Annanetrebko ||  ||  || July 30, 1997 || Caussols || ODAS || FLO || align=right | 2.7 km || 
|-id=105 bgcolor=#fefefe
| 31105 Oguniyamagata ||  ||  || July 27, 1997 || Nanyo || T. Okuni || — || align=right | 3.5 km || 
|-id=106 bgcolor=#fefefe
| 31106 ||  || — || August 12, 1997 || Kleť || Kleť Obs. || PHO || align=right | 3.4 km || 
|-id=107 bgcolor=#fefefe
| 31107 ||  || — || August 5, 1997 || Xinglong || SCAP || — || align=right | 1.9 km || 
|-id=108 bgcolor=#fefefe
| 31108 ||  || — || August 10, 1997 || Xinglong || SCAP || V || align=right | 2.3 km || 
|-id=109 bgcolor=#fefefe
| 31109 Janpalouš ||  ||  || August 14, 1997 || Kleť || M. Tichý, Z. Moravec || V || align=right | 3.6 km || 
|-id=110 bgcolor=#fefefe
| 31110 Clapas ||  ||  || August 13, 1997 || Pises || Pises Obs. || — || align=right | 2.1 km || 
|-id=111 bgcolor=#E9E9E9
| 31111 ||  || — || August 11, 1997 || Nachi-Katsuura || Y. Shimizu, T. Urata || EUN || align=right | 5.3 km || 
|-id=112 bgcolor=#fefefe
| 31112 ||  || — || August 9, 1997 || Lake Clear || K. A. Williams || — || align=right | 1.6 km || 
|-id=113 bgcolor=#fefefe
| 31113 Stull || 1997 QC ||  || August 19, 1997 || Alfred University || D. R. De Graff, J. S. Weaver || V || align=right | 2.1 km || 
|-id=114 bgcolor=#fefefe
| 31114 ||  || — || August 28, 1997 || Kleť || Z. Moravec || — || align=right | 2.0 km || 
|-id=115 bgcolor=#fefefe
| 31115 ||  || — || August 28, 1997 || Xinglong || SCAP || FLO || align=right | 2.9 km || 
|-id=116 bgcolor=#fefefe
| 31116 ||  || — || August 29, 1997 || Majorca || Á. López J., R. Pacheco || — || align=right | 1.9 km || 
|-id=117 bgcolor=#fefefe
| 31117 ||  || — || August 25, 1997 || Reedy Creek || J. Broughton || — || align=right | 2.2 km || 
|-id=118 bgcolor=#E9E9E9
| 31118 ||  || — || September 1, 1997 || Xinglong || SCAP || — || align=right | 1.8 km || 
|-id=119 bgcolor=#fefefe
| 31119 ||  || — || September 3, 1997 || Gekko || T. Kagawa, T. Urata || — || align=right | 2.3 km || 
|-id=120 bgcolor=#fefefe
| 31120 ||  || — || September 12, 1997 || Xinglong || SCAP || MAS || align=right | 2.3 km || 
|-id=121 bgcolor=#E9E9E9
| 31121 ||  || — || September 13, 1997 || Xinglong || SCAP || — || align=right | 2.8 km || 
|-id=122 bgcolor=#fefefe
| 31122 Brooktaylor || 1997 SD ||  || September 21, 1997 || Prescott || P. G. Comba || — || align=right | 2.6 km || 
|-id=123 bgcolor=#fefefe
| 31123 || 1997 SU || — || September 16, 1997 || Xinglong || SCAP || V || align=right | 3.2 km || 
|-id=124 bgcolor=#fefefe
| 31124 Slavíček ||  ||  || September 22, 1997 || Kleť || M. Tichý || — || align=right | 2.9 km || 
|-id=125 bgcolor=#fefefe
| 31125 ||  || — || September 22, 1997 || Rand || G. R. Viscome || — || align=right | 2.6 km || 
|-id=126 bgcolor=#fefefe
| 31126 ||  || — || September 19, 1997 || Dynic || A. Sugie || — || align=right | 4.2 km || 
|-id=127 bgcolor=#E9E9E9
| 31127 ||  || — || September 27, 1997 || Oizumi || T. Kobayashi || — || align=right | 3.9 km || 
|-id=128 bgcolor=#E9E9E9
| 31128 ||  || — || September 27, 1997 || Kitt Peak || Spacewatch || — || align=right | 1.7 km || 
|-id=129 bgcolor=#E9E9E9
| 31129 Langyatai ||  ||  || September 26, 1997 || Xinglong || SCAP || — || align=right | 3.9 km || 
|-id=130 bgcolor=#fefefe
| 31130 ||  || — || September 26, 1997 || Xinglong || SCAP || — || align=right | 3.3 km || 
|-id=131 bgcolor=#fefefe
| 31131 ||  || — || September 28, 1997 || Xinglong || SCAP || FLO || align=right | 2.5 km || 
|-id=132 bgcolor=#fefefe
| 31132 ||  || — || September 28, 1997 || Kitt Peak || Spacewatch || V || align=right | 2.2 km || 
|-id=133 bgcolor=#fefefe
| 31133 ||  || — || September 27, 1997 || Caussols || ODAS || — || align=right | 5.7 km || 
|-id=134 bgcolor=#fefefe
| 31134 Zurria ||  ||  || September 27, 1997 || Bologna || San Vittore Obs. || NYS || align=right | 1.9 km || 
|-id=135 bgcolor=#fefefe
| 31135 ||  || — || September 30, 1997 || Kitt Peak || Spacewatch || — || align=right | 4.4 km || 
|-id=136 bgcolor=#fefefe
| 31136 ||  || — || September 28, 1997 || Kitt Peak || Spacewatch || FLO || align=right | 3.1 km || 
|-id=137 bgcolor=#fefefe
| 31137 ||  || — || September 30, 1997 || Xinglong || SCAP || NYS || align=right | 2.5 km || 
|-id=138 bgcolor=#fefefe
| 31138 ||  || — || September 29, 1997 || Xinglong || SCAP || — || align=right | 2.2 km || 
|-id=139 bgcolor=#fefefe
| 31139 Garnavich ||  ||  || September 25, 1997 || Ondřejov || Ondřejov Obs. || MAS || align=right | 2.0 km || 
|-id=140 bgcolor=#E9E9E9
| 31140 ||  || — || October 2, 1997 || Kitt Peak || Spacewatch || — || align=right | 2.0 km || 
|-id=141 bgcolor=#fefefe
| 31141 ||  || — || October 3, 1997 || Xinglong || SCAP || NYS || align=right | 1.9 km || 
|-id=142 bgcolor=#fefefe
| 31142 ||  || — || October 5, 1997 || Kitt Peak || Spacewatch || — || align=right | 5.1 km || 
|-id=143 bgcolor=#fefefe
| 31143 ||  || — || October 8, 1997 || Xinglong || SCAP || — || align=right | 3.9 km || 
|-id=144 bgcolor=#fefefe
| 31144 ||  || — || October 7, 1997 || Church Stretton || S. P. Laurie || — || align=right | 3.1 km || 
|-id=145 bgcolor=#fefefe
| 31145 || 1997 UK || — || October 19, 1997 || Kleť || Kleť Obs. || — || align=right | 2.6 km || 
|-id=146 bgcolor=#fefefe
| 31146 ||  || — || October 26, 1997 || Oizumi || T. Kobayashi || NYS || align=right | 3.5 km || 
|-id=147 bgcolor=#fefefe
| 31147 Miriquidi ||  ||  || October 22, 1997 || Drebach || J. Kandler || — || align=right | 3.5 km || 
|-id=148 bgcolor=#E9E9E9
| 31148 ||  || — || October 23, 1997 || Kushiro || S. Ueda, H. Kaneda || MAR || align=right | 7.2 km || 
|-id=149 bgcolor=#fefefe
| 31149 ||  || — || October 23, 1997 || Kitt Peak || Spacewatch || NYS || align=right | 1.5 km || 
|-id=150 bgcolor=#fefefe
| 31150 ||  || — || October 23, 1997 || Xinglong || SCAP || — || align=right | 2.3 km || 
|-id=151 bgcolor=#fefefe
| 31151 Sajichugaku ||  ||  || October 29, 1997 || Saji || Saji Obs. || FLO || align=right | 2.3 km || 
|-id=152 bgcolor=#E9E9E9
| 31152 Daishinsai ||  ||  || October 29, 1997 || Nanyo || T. Okuni || — || align=right | 8.5 km || 
|-id=153 bgcolor=#fefefe
| 31153 Enricaparri ||  ||  || October 26, 1997 || Cima Ekar || G. Forti, M. Tombelli || FLO || align=right | 3.1 km || 
|-id=154 bgcolor=#fefefe
| 31154 || 1997 VJ || — || November 1, 1997 || Oizumi || T. Kobayashi || PHO || align=right | 3.3 km || 
|-id=155 bgcolor=#fefefe
| 31155 ||  || — || November 1, 1997 || Oizumi || T. Kobayashi || — || align=right | 2.4 km || 
|-id=156 bgcolor=#fefefe
| 31156 || 1997 WO || — || November 18, 1997 || Oizumi || T. Kobayashi || NYS || align=right | 6.0 km || 
|-id=157 bgcolor=#E9E9E9
| 31157 ||  || — || November 19, 1997 || Xinglong || SCAP || PAD || align=right | 5.5 km || 
|-id=158 bgcolor=#d6d6d6
| 31158 ||  || — || November 23, 1997 || Oizumi || T. Kobayashi || — || align=right | 7.2 km || 
|-id=159 bgcolor=#fefefe
| 31159 ||  || — || November 23, 1997 || Kitt Peak || Spacewatch || — || align=right | 3.6 km || 
|-id=160 bgcolor=#fefefe
| 31160 ||  || — || November 21, 1997 || Kitt Peak || Spacewatch || NYS || align=right | 2.2 km || 
|-id=161 bgcolor=#E9E9E9
| 31161 ||  || — || November 22, 1997 || Kitt Peak || Spacewatch || — || align=right | 2.6 km || 
|-id=162 bgcolor=#E9E9E9
| 31162 ||  || — || November 23, 1997 || Kitt Peak || Spacewatch || — || align=right | 4.7 km || 
|-id=163 bgcolor=#E9E9E9
| 31163 ||  || — || November 23, 1997 || Kitt Peak || Spacewatch || — || align=right | 3.6 km || 
|-id=164 bgcolor=#fefefe
| 31164 ||  || — || November 29, 1997 || Socorro || LINEAR || NYS || align=right | 3.8 km || 
|-id=165 bgcolor=#E9E9E9
| 31165 ||  || — || November 29, 1997 || Socorro || LINEAR || — || align=right | 3.3 km || 
|-id=166 bgcolor=#fefefe
| 31166 ||  || — || November 26, 1997 || Socorro || LINEAR || — || align=right | 2.4 km || 
|-id=167 bgcolor=#fefefe
| 31167 ||  || — || November 26, 1997 || Socorro || LINEAR || NYS || align=right | 2.4 km || 
|-id=168 bgcolor=#E9E9E9
| 31168 ||  || — || November 29, 1997 || Socorro || LINEAR || — || align=right | 3.9 km || 
|-id=169 bgcolor=#E9E9E9
| 31169 ||  || — || November 29, 1997 || Socorro || LINEAR || — || align=right | 4.2 km || 
|-id=170 bgcolor=#fefefe
| 31170 ||  || — || November 26, 1997 || La Silla || UDTS || PHO || align=right | 4.5 km || 
|-id=171 bgcolor=#E9E9E9
| 31171 || 1997 XB || — || December 2, 1997 || Oizumi || T. Kobayashi || — || align=right | 2.2 km || 
|-id=172 bgcolor=#E9E9E9
| 31172 || 1997 XQ || — || December 3, 1997 || Oizumi || T. Kobayashi || — || align=right | 2.5 km || 
|-id=173 bgcolor=#fefefe
| 31173 ||  || — || December 4, 1997 || Socorro || LINEAR || Hslow || align=right | 1.6 km || 
|-id=174 bgcolor=#d6d6d6
| 31174 Rozelot ||  ||  || December 6, 1997 || Caussols || ODAS || — || align=right | 3.4 km || 
|-id=175 bgcolor=#E9E9E9
| 31175 Erikafuchs ||  ||  || December 7, 1997 || Caussols || ODAS || EUN || align=right | 6.2 km || 
|-id=176 bgcolor=#fefefe
| 31176 ||  || — || December 2, 1997 || Nachi-Katsuura || Y. Shimizu, T. Urata || V || align=right | 3.7 km || 
|-id=177 bgcolor=#E9E9E9
| 31177 ||  || — || December 13, 1997 || Xinglong || SCAP || slow || align=right | 5.4 km || 
|-id=178 bgcolor=#d6d6d6
| 31178 ||  || — || December 4, 1997 || Kitt Peak || Spacewatch || — || align=right | 13 km || 
|-id=179 bgcolor=#fefefe
| 31179 Gongju ||  ||  || December 21, 1997 || Chichibu || N. Satō || NYS || align=right | 4.7 km || 
|-id=180 bgcolor=#FA8072
| 31180 ||  || — || December 22, 1997 || Xinglong || SCAP || — || align=right | 6.2 km || 
|-id=181 bgcolor=#d6d6d6
| 31181 ||  || — || December 22, 1997 || Xinglong || SCAP || — || align=right | 4.4 km || 
|-id=182 bgcolor=#fefefe
| 31182 ||  || — || December 22, 1997 || Xinglong || SCAP || Hslow || align=right | 1.9 km || 
|-id=183 bgcolor=#fefefe
| 31183 ||  || — || December 25, 1997 || Haleakala || NEAT || — || align=right | 2.1 km || 
|-id=184 bgcolor=#E9E9E9
| 31184 ||  || — || December 26, 1997 || Sudbury || D. di Cicco || — || align=right | 2.9 km || 
|-id=185 bgcolor=#E9E9E9
| 31185 ||  || — || December 25, 1997 || Oizumi || T. Kobayashi || — || align=right | 8.0 km || 
|-id=186 bgcolor=#E9E9E9
| 31186 ||  || — || December 25, 1997 || Oizumi || T. Kobayashi || — || align=right | 4.2 km || 
|-id=187 bgcolor=#E9E9E9
| 31187 ||  || — || December 27, 1997 || Oizumi || T. Kobayashi || ADE || align=right | 8.1 km || 
|-id=188 bgcolor=#E9E9E9
| 31188 ||  || — || December 27, 1997 || Oizumi || T. Kobayashi || GEF || align=right | 3.7 km || 
|-id=189 bgcolor=#E9E9E9
| 31189 Tricomi ||  ||  || December 27, 1997 || Prescott || P. G. Comba || — || align=right | 3.1 km || 
|-id=190 bgcolor=#E9E9E9
| 31190 Toussaint ||  ||  || December 27, 1997 || Goodricke-Pigott || R. A. Tucker || MAR || align=right | 4.5 km || 
|-id=191 bgcolor=#E9E9E9
| 31191 ||  || — || December 28, 1997 || Kitt Peak || Spacewatch || — || align=right | 5.3 km || 
|-id=192 bgcolor=#E9E9E9
| 31192 Aigoual ||  ||  || December 29, 1997 || Pises || Pises Obs. || XIZ || align=right | 6.0 km || 
|-id=193 bgcolor=#E9E9E9
| 31193 ||  || — || December 31, 1997 || Nachi-Katsuura || Y. Shimizu, T. Urata || — || align=right | 5.1 km || 
|-id=194 bgcolor=#E9E9E9
| 31194 ||  || — || December 24, 1997 || Xinglong || SCAP || — || align=right | 4.6 km || 
|-id=195 bgcolor=#d6d6d6
| 31195 ||  || — || December 29, 1997 || Xinglong || SCAP || TEL || align=right | 4.1 km || 
|-id=196 bgcolor=#E9E9E9
| 31196 Yulong ||  ||  || December 24, 1997 || Xinglong || Xinglong Stn. || — || align=right | 5.7 km || 
|-id=197 bgcolor=#fefefe
| 31197 ||  || — || December 31, 1997 || Socorro || LINEAR || V || align=right | 2.7 km || 
|-id=198 bgcolor=#d6d6d6
| 31198 ||  || — || January 5, 1998 || Oizumi || T. Kobayashi || — || align=right | 7.3 km || 
|-id=199 bgcolor=#E9E9E9
| 31199 ||  || — || January 5, 1998 || Chichibu || N. Satō || AGN || align=right | 4.6 km || 
|-id=200 bgcolor=#d6d6d6
| 31200 ||  || — || January 6, 1998 || Kitt Peak || Spacewatch || KOR || align=right | 4.1 km || 
|}

31201–31300 

|-bgcolor=#d6d6d6
| 31201 Michellegrand ||  ||  || January 8, 1998 || Caussols || ODAS || EOS || align=right | 7.3 km || 
|-id=202 bgcolor=#E9E9E9
| 31202 ||  || — || January 2, 1998 || Socorro || LINEAR || EUN || align=right | 5.0 km || 
|-id=203 bgcolor=#d6d6d6
| 31203 Hersman ||  ||  || January 6, 1998 || Anderson Mesa || M. W. Buie || KOR || align=right | 3.7 km || 
|-id=204 bgcolor=#E9E9E9
| 31204 ||  || — || January 15, 1998 || Kleť || Kleť Obs. || MAR || align=right | 4.4 km || 
|-id=205 bgcolor=#d6d6d6
| 31205 || 1998 BW || — || January 19, 1998 || Oizumi || T. Kobayashi || 627 || align=right | 14 km || 
|-id=206 bgcolor=#E9E9E9
| 31206 ||  || — || January 19, 1998 || Oizumi || T. Kobayashi || — || align=right | 9.2 km || 
|-id=207 bgcolor=#d6d6d6
| 31207 ||  || — || January 19, 1998 || Oizumi || T. Kobayashi || HYG || align=right | 7.7 km || 
|-id=208 bgcolor=#E9E9E9
| 31208 ||  || — || January 19, 1998 || Oizumi || T. Kobayashi || EUN || align=right | 4.2 km || 
|-id=209 bgcolor=#E9E9E9
| 31209 ||  || — || January 24, 1998 || Oizumi || T. Kobayashi || — || align=right | 9.2 km || 
|-id=210 bgcolor=#FFC2E0
| 31210 ||  || — || January 24, 1998 || Haleakala || NEAT || AMO +1km || align=right | 1.9 km || 
|-id=211 bgcolor=#d6d6d6
| 31211 ||  || — || January 18, 1998 || Xinglong || SCAP || HYG || align=right | 9.4 km || 
|-id=212 bgcolor=#E9E9E9
| 31212 ||  || — || January 18, 1998 || Xinglong || SCAP || — || align=right | 6.4 km || 
|-id=213 bgcolor=#d6d6d6
| 31213 ||  || — || January 24, 1998 || Haleakala || NEAT || — || align=right | 9.1 km || 
|-id=214 bgcolor=#E9E9E9
| 31214 ||  || — || January 22, 1998 || Kitt Peak || Spacewatch || — || align=right | 3.4 km || 
|-id=215 bgcolor=#d6d6d6
| 31215 ||  || — || January 26, 1998 || Kleť || Kleť Obs. || — || align=right | 6.4 km || 
|-id=216 bgcolor=#E9E9E9
| 31216 ||  || — || January 23, 1998 || Socorro || LINEAR || — || align=right | 7.4 km || 
|-id=217 bgcolor=#E9E9E9
| 31217 ||  || — || January 24, 1998 || Haleakala || NEAT || — || align=right | 7.9 km || 
|-id=218 bgcolor=#d6d6d6
| 31218 ||  || — || January 22, 1998 || Kitt Peak || Spacewatch || KOR || align=right | 4.0 km || 
|-id=219 bgcolor=#d6d6d6
| 31219 ||  || — || January 28, 1998 || Oizumi || T. Kobayashi || TIR || align=right | 5.2 km || 
|-id=220 bgcolor=#E9E9E9
| 31220 ||  || — || January 29, 1998 || Oizumi || T. Kobayashi || JUN || align=right | 3.6 km || 
|-id=221 bgcolor=#FFC2E0
| 31221 ||  || — || January 28, 1998 || Haleakala || NEAT || AMO +1km || align=right | 1.3 km || 
|-id=222 bgcolor=#d6d6d6
| 31222 ||  || — || January 26, 1998 || Gekko || T. Kagawa, T. Urata || — || align=right | 5.1 km || 
|-id=223 bgcolor=#E9E9E9
| 31223 ||  || — || January 28, 1998 || Bédoin || P. Antonini || — || align=right | 4.2 km || 
|-id=224 bgcolor=#E9E9E9
| 31224 ||  || — || January 31, 1998 || Oizumi || T. Kobayashi || GEF || align=right | 4.1 km || 
|-id=225 bgcolor=#E9E9E9
| 31225 ||  || — || January 27, 1998 || Kitt Peak || Spacewatch || — || align=right | 3.4 km || 
|-id=226 bgcolor=#d6d6d6
| 31226 ||  || — || January 24, 1998 || Haleakala || NEAT || THM || align=right | 7.7 km || 
|-id=227 bgcolor=#E9E9E9
| 31227 ||  || — || January 24, 1998 || Haleakala || NEAT || EUN || align=right | 9.6 km || 
|-id=228 bgcolor=#E9E9E9
| 31228 ||  || — || January 24, 1998 || Haleakala || NEAT || — || align=right | 3.3 km || 
|-id=229 bgcolor=#E9E9E9
| 31229 ||  || — || January 26, 1998 || Kitt Peak || Spacewatch || ADE || align=right | 5.7 km || 
|-id=230 bgcolor=#E9E9E9
| 31230 Tuyouyou ||  ||  || January 18, 1998 || Xinglong || SCAP || EUN || align=right | 5.7 km || 
|-id=231 bgcolor=#E9E9E9
| 31231 Uthmann || 1998 CA ||  || February 1, 1998 || Drebach || J. Kandler, G. Lehmann || — || align=right | 5.9 km || 
|-id=232 bgcolor=#d6d6d6
| 31232 Slavonice || 1998 CF ||  || February 1, 1998 || Kleť || J. Tichá, M. Tichý || — || align=right | 7.3 km || 
|-id=233 bgcolor=#d6d6d6
| 31233 ||  || — || February 1, 1998 || Xinglong || SCAP || EOS || align=right | 4.7 km || 
|-id=234 bgcolor=#d6d6d6
| 31234 Bea ||  ||  || February 7, 1998 || Modra || A. Galád, A. Pravda || — || align=right | 5.2 km || 
|-id=235 bgcolor=#d6d6d6
| 31235 ||  || — || February 6, 1998 || La Silla || E. W. Elst || EOS || align=right | 6.6 km || 
|-id=236 bgcolor=#d6d6d6
| 31236 ||  || — || February 14, 1998 || Farra d'Isonzo || Farra d'Isonzo || EOS || align=right | 7.0 km || 
|-id=237 bgcolor=#d6d6d6
| 31237 ||  || — || February 6, 1998 || La Silla || E. W. Elst || KOR || align=right | 4.4 km || 
|-id=238 bgcolor=#d6d6d6
| 31238 Kroměříž ||  ||  || February 21, 1998 || Kleť || J. Tichá, M. Tichý || 7:4 || align=right | 7.3 km || 
|-id=239 bgcolor=#E9E9E9
| 31239 Michaeljames ||  ||  || February 21, 1998 || Cocoa || I. P. Griffin || EUN || align=right | 4.5 km || 
|-id=240 bgcolor=#E9E9E9
| 31240 Katrianne ||  ||  || February 20, 1998 || Drebach || G. Lehmann || DOR || align=right | 8.6 km || 
|-id=241 bgcolor=#d6d6d6
| 31241 ||  || — || February 20, 1998 || Caussols || ODAS || — || align=right | 7.5 km || 
|-id=242 bgcolor=#d6d6d6
| 31242 ||  || — || February 23, 1998 || Haleakala || NEAT || — || align=right | 10 km || 
|-id=243 bgcolor=#d6d6d6
| 31243 ||  || — || February 16, 1998 || Xinglong || SCAP || EOS || align=right | 6.9 km || 
|-id=244 bgcolor=#d6d6d6
| 31244 ||  || — || February 19, 1998 || Sormano || P. Sicoli, A. Testa || — || align=right | 7.3 km || 
|-id=245 bgcolor=#d6d6d6
| 31245 ||  || — || February 24, 1998 || Haleakala || NEAT || KOR || align=right | 4.9 km || 
|-id=246 bgcolor=#E9E9E9
| 31246 ||  || — || February 24, 1998 || Zeno || T. Stafford || RAF || align=right | 3.8 km || 
|-id=247 bgcolor=#d6d6d6
| 31247 ||  || — || February 22, 1998 || Haleakala || NEAT || — || align=right | 9.8 km || 
|-id=248 bgcolor=#d6d6d6
| 31248 ||  || — || February 24, 1998 || Haleakala || NEAT || — || align=right | 7.2 km || 
|-id=249 bgcolor=#d6d6d6
| 31249 Renéefleming ||  ||  || February 27, 1998 || Caussols || ODAS || 2:1J || align=right | 7.0 km || 
|-id=250 bgcolor=#d6d6d6
| 31250 ||  || — || February 22, 1998 || Haleakala || NEAT || — || align=right | 7.9 km || 
|-id=251 bgcolor=#d6d6d6
| 31251 ||  || — || February 22, 1998 || Haleakala || NEAT || — || align=right | 9.8 km || 
|-id=252 bgcolor=#d6d6d6
| 31252 ||  || — || February 22, 1998 || Haleakala || NEAT || ALA || align=right | 10 km || 
|-id=253 bgcolor=#d6d6d6
| 31253 ||  || — || February 22, 1998 || Kitt Peak || Spacewatch || — || align=right | 4.1 km || 
|-id=254 bgcolor=#E9E9E9
| 31254 ||  || — || February 27, 1998 || Sormano || M. Cavagna, P. Chiavenna || — || align=right | 12 km || 
|-id=255 bgcolor=#d6d6d6
| 31255 ||  || — || February 27, 1998 || Bédoin || P. Antonini || HYG || align=right | 8.4 km || 
|-id=256 bgcolor=#E9E9E9
| 31256 ||  || — || February 22, 1998 || Xinglong || SCAP || — || align=right | 4.9 km || 
|-id=257 bgcolor=#d6d6d6
| 31257 ||  || — || February 27, 1998 || La Silla || E. W. Elst || EOS || align=right | 5.8 km || 
|-id=258 bgcolor=#d6d6d6
| 31258 || 1998 EE || — || March 1, 1998 || Oizumi || T. Kobayashi || EOS || align=right | 8.6 km || 
|-id=259 bgcolor=#E9E9E9
| 31259 ||  || — || March 1, 1998 || Xinglong || SCAP || — || align=right | 7.9 km || 
|-id=260 bgcolor=#E9E9E9
| 31260 ||  || — || March 2, 1998 || Nachi-Katsuura || Y. Shimizu, T. Urata || — || align=right | 6.1 km || 
|-id=261 bgcolor=#E9E9E9
| 31261 ||  || — || March 2, 1998 || Xinglong || SCAP || DOR || align=right | 8.6 km || 
|-id=262 bgcolor=#E9E9E9
| 31262 ||  || — || March 5, 1998 || Xinglong || SCAP || MRX || align=right | 3.7 km || 
|-id=263 bgcolor=#fefefe
| 31263 ||  || — || March 8, 1998 || Xinglong || SCAP || — || align=right | 5.4 km || 
|-id=264 bgcolor=#d6d6d6
| 31264 ||  || — || March 1, 1998 || La Silla || E. W. Elst || — || align=right | 7.8 km || 
|-id=265 bgcolor=#d6d6d6
| 31265 ||  || — || March 1, 1998 || La Silla || E. W. Elst || — || align=right | 11 km || 
|-id=266 bgcolor=#d6d6d6
| 31266 Tournefort ||  ||  || March 1, 1998 || La Silla || E. W. Elst || — || align=right | 8.1 km || 
|-id=267 bgcolor=#d6d6d6
| 31267 Kuldiga ||  ||  || March 1, 1998 || La Silla || E. W. Elst || EOS || align=right | 10 km || 
|-id=268 bgcolor=#E9E9E9
| 31268 Welty || 1998 FA ||  || March 16, 1998 || Cocoa || I. P. Griffin || — || align=right | 4.2 km || 
|-id=269 bgcolor=#E9E9E9
| 31269 || 1998 FO || — || March 18, 1998 || Kitt Peak || Spacewatch || — || align=right | 6.5 km || 
|-id=270 bgcolor=#d6d6d6
| 31270 ||  || — || March 26, 1998 || Caussols || ODAS || EOS || align=right | 7.4 km || 
|-id=271 bgcolor=#d6d6d6
| 31271 Nallino ||  ||  || March 25, 1998 || Bologna || San Vittore Obs. || THM || align=right | 8.9 km || 
|-id=272 bgcolor=#d6d6d6
| 31272 Makosinski ||  ||  || March 20, 1998 || Socorro || LINEAR || — || align=right | 8.6 km || 
|-id=273 bgcolor=#d6d6d6
| 31273 ||  || — || March 20, 1998 || Socorro || LINEAR || — || align=right | 8.1 km || 
|-id=274 bgcolor=#d6d6d6
| 31274 ||  || — || March 20, 1998 || Socorro || LINEAR || HYG || align=right | 9.1 km || 
|-id=275 bgcolor=#d6d6d6
| 31275 ||  || — || March 20, 1998 || Socorro || LINEAR || EOS || align=right | 4.1 km || 
|-id=276 bgcolor=#d6d6d6
| 31276 Calvinrieder ||  ||  || March 20, 1998 || Socorro || LINEAR || KOR || align=right | 3.2 km || 
|-id=277 bgcolor=#d6d6d6
| 31277 ||  || — || March 20, 1998 || Socorro || LINEAR || — || align=right | 8.7 km || 
|-id=278 bgcolor=#E9E9E9
| 31278 ||  || — || March 20, 1998 || Socorro || LINEAR || — || align=right | 5.3 km || 
|-id=279 bgcolor=#d6d6d6
| 31279 ||  || — || March 20, 1998 || Socorro || LINEAR || THM || align=right | 8.1 km || 
|-id=280 bgcolor=#d6d6d6
| 31280 ||  || — || March 20, 1998 || Socorro || LINEAR || — || align=right | 7.7 km || 
|-id=281 bgcolor=#E9E9E9
| 31281 Stothers ||  ||  || March 20, 1998 || Socorro || LINEAR || — || align=right | 7.2 km || 
|-id=282 bgcolor=#d6d6d6
| 31282 Nicoleticea ||  ||  || March 20, 1998 || Socorro || LINEAR || — || align=right | 6.8 km || 
|-id=283 bgcolor=#E9E9E9
| 31283 Wanruomeng ||  ||  || March 20, 1998 || Socorro || LINEAR || — || align=right | 3.4 km || 
|-id=284 bgcolor=#d6d6d6
| 31284 ||  || — || March 20, 1998 || Socorro || LINEAR || HIL3:2 || align=right | 17 km || 
|-id=285 bgcolor=#d6d6d6
| 31285 ||  || — || March 20, 1998 || Socorro || LINEAR || — || align=right | 12 km || 
|-id=286 bgcolor=#d6d6d6
| 31286 ||  || — || March 20, 1998 || Socorro || LINEAR || — || align=right | 5.3 km || 
|-id=287 bgcolor=#d6d6d6
| 31287 ||  || — || March 20, 1998 || Socorro || LINEAR || — || align=right | 7.2 km || 
|-id=288 bgcolor=#d6d6d6
| 31288 ||  || — || March 20, 1998 || Socorro || LINEAR || EOS || align=right | 7.1 km || 
|-id=289 bgcolor=#d6d6d6
| 31289 ||  || — || March 20, 1998 || Socorro || LINEAR || EOS || align=right | 6.6 km || 
|-id=290 bgcolor=#d6d6d6
| 31290 ||  || — || March 20, 1998 || Socorro || LINEAR || — || align=right | 5.1 km || 
|-id=291 bgcolor=#d6d6d6
| 31291 Yaoyue ||  ||  || March 20, 1998 || Socorro || LINEAR || THM || align=right | 7.6 km || 
|-id=292 bgcolor=#d6d6d6
| 31292 ||  || — || March 20, 1998 || Socorro || LINEAR || THM || align=right | 7.5 km || 
|-id=293 bgcolor=#d6d6d6
| 31293 ||  || — || March 20, 1998 || Socorro || LINEAR || 2:1J || align=right | 8.0 km || 
|-id=294 bgcolor=#d6d6d6
| 31294 ||  || — || March 20, 1998 || Socorro || LINEAR || EOS || align=right | 4.2 km || 
|-id=295 bgcolor=#d6d6d6
| 31295 ||  || — || March 20, 1998 || Socorro || LINEAR || — || align=right | 8.5 km || 
|-id=296 bgcolor=#d6d6d6
| 31296 ||  || — || March 22, 1998 || Anderson Mesa || LONEOS || EOS || align=right | 9.5 km || 
|-id=297 bgcolor=#d6d6d6
| 31297 ||  || — || March 24, 1998 || Socorro || LINEAR || EOS || align=right | 7.3 km || 
|-id=298 bgcolor=#d6d6d6
| 31298 Chantaihei ||  ||  || March 24, 1998 || Socorro || LINEAR || — || align=right | 4.4 km || 
|-id=299 bgcolor=#d6d6d6
| 31299 ||  || — || March 24, 1998 || Socorro || LINEAR || — || align=right | 8.4 km || 
|-id=300 bgcolor=#d6d6d6
| 31300 ||  || — || March 24, 1998 || Socorro || LINEAR || — || align=right | 13 km || 
|}

31301–31400 

|-bgcolor=#d6d6d6
| 31301 ||  || — || March 24, 1998 || Socorro || LINEAR || EOS || align=right | 8.1 km || 
|-id=302 bgcolor=#d6d6d6
| 31302 ||  || — || March 31, 1998 || Socorro || LINEAR || EOS || align=right | 5.0 km || 
|-id=303 bgcolor=#d6d6d6
| 31303 ||  || — || March 31, 1998 || Socorro || LINEAR || — || align=right | 6.6 km || 
|-id=304 bgcolor=#d6d6d6
| 31304 ||  || — || March 31, 1998 || Socorro || LINEAR || EOS || align=right | 5.3 km || 
|-id=305 bgcolor=#d6d6d6
| 31305 ||  || — || March 31, 1998 || Socorro || LINEAR || EOS || align=right | 6.1 km || 
|-id=306 bgcolor=#d6d6d6
| 31306 ||  || — || March 31, 1998 || Socorro || LINEAR || — || align=right | 8.4 km || 
|-id=307 bgcolor=#d6d6d6
| 31307 ||  || — || March 31, 1998 || Socorro || LINEAR || LIX || align=right | 14 km || 
|-id=308 bgcolor=#d6d6d6
| 31308 ||  || — || March 31, 1998 || Socorro || LINEAR || — || align=right | 7.8 km || 
|-id=309 bgcolor=#d6d6d6
| 31309 ||  || — || March 31, 1998 || Socorro || LINEAR || URS || align=right | 12 km || 
|-id=310 bgcolor=#d6d6d6
| 31310 ||  || — || March 31, 1998 || Socorro || LINEAR || 628 || align=right | 5.6 km || 
|-id=311 bgcolor=#d6d6d6
| 31311 ||  || — || March 31, 1998 || Socorro || LINEAR || — || align=right | 12 km || 
|-id=312 bgcolor=#E9E9E9
| 31312 Fangerhai ||  ||  || March 31, 1998 || Socorro || LINEAR || — || align=right | 6.9 km || 
|-id=313 bgcolor=#d6d6d6
| 31313 Kanwingyi ||  ||  || March 20, 1998 || Socorro || LINEAR || — || align=right | 4.8 km || 
|-id=314 bgcolor=#d6d6d6
| 31314 ||  || — || March 20, 1998 || Socorro || LINEAR || JLI || align=right | 7.4 km || 
|-id=315 bgcolor=#d6d6d6
| 31315 ||  || — || March 20, 1998 || Socorro || LINEAR || — || align=right | 14 km || 
|-id=316 bgcolor=#d6d6d6
| 31316 ||  || — || April 2, 1998 || Socorro || LINEAR || — || align=right | 13 km || 
|-id=317 bgcolor=#d6d6d6
| 31317 ||  || — || April 2, 1998 || Socorro || LINEAR || — || align=right | 6.2 km || 
|-id=318 bgcolor=#FA8072
| 31318 ||  || — || April 4, 1998 || Fair Oaks Ranch || J. V. McClusky || — || align=right | 2.4 km || 
|-id=319 bgcolor=#d6d6d6
| 31319 Vespucci ||  ||  || April 20, 1998 || Colleverde || V. S. Casulli || URS || align=right | 13 km || 
|-id=320 bgcolor=#FA8072
| 31320 ||  || — || April 21, 1998 || Socorro || LINEAR || H || align=right | 2.6 km || 
|-id=321 bgcolor=#d6d6d6
| 31321 ||  || — || April 21, 1998 || Kleť || Kleť Obs. || HYG || align=right | 8.3 km || 
|-id=322 bgcolor=#d6d6d6
| 31322 ||  || — || April 17, 1998 || Kitt Peak || Spacewatch || THM || align=right | 8.3 km || 
|-id=323 bgcolor=#E9E9E9
| 31323 Lysá hora ||  ||  || April 27, 1998 || Ondřejov || P. Pravec || — || align=right | 5.5 km || 
|-id=324 bgcolor=#d6d6d6
| 31324 Jiřímrázek ||  ||  || April 27, 1998 || Ondřejov || L. Kotková || — || align=right | 6.0 km || 
|-id=325 bgcolor=#d6d6d6
| 31325 ||  || — || April 20, 1998 || Socorro || LINEAR || — || align=right | 9.5 km || 
|-id=326 bgcolor=#d6d6d6
| 31326 ||  || — || April 20, 1998 || Socorro || LINEAR || EOS || align=right | 5.8 km || 
|-id=327 bgcolor=#d6d6d6
| 31327 ||  || — || April 20, 1998 || Socorro || LINEAR || — || align=right | 7.1 km || 
|-id=328 bgcolor=#d6d6d6
| 31328 ||  || — || April 20, 1998 || Socorro || LINEAR || HYG || align=right | 7.5 km || 
|-id=329 bgcolor=#d6d6d6
| 31329 ||  || — || April 21, 1998 || Socorro || LINEAR || — || align=right | 11 km || 
|-id=330 bgcolor=#d6d6d6
| 31330 ||  || — || April 21, 1998 || Socorro || LINEAR || — || align=right | 11 km || 
|-id=331 bgcolor=#d6d6d6
| 31331 ||  || — || April 21, 1998 || Socorro || LINEAR || EOS || align=right | 5.0 km || 
|-id=332 bgcolor=#d6d6d6
| 31332 ||  || — || April 21, 1998 || Socorro || LINEAR || — || align=right | 7.4 km || 
|-id=333 bgcolor=#d6d6d6
| 31333 ||  || — || April 21, 1998 || Socorro || LINEAR || — || align=right | 12 km || 
|-id=334 bgcolor=#d6d6d6
| 31334 ||  || — || April 25, 1998 || La Silla || E. W. Elst || THM || align=right | 10 km || 
|-id=335 bgcolor=#d6d6d6
| 31335 ||  || — || April 23, 1998 || Socorro || LINEAR || ALA || align=right | 14 km || 
|-id=336 bgcolor=#d6d6d6
| 31336 Chenyuhsin ||  ||  || April 19, 1998 || Socorro || LINEAR || — || align=right | 6.6 km || 
|-id=337 bgcolor=#d6d6d6
| 31337 ||  || — || April 19, 1998 || Socorro || LINEAR || EOS || align=right | 5.2 km || 
|-id=338 bgcolor=#d6d6d6
| 31338 Lipperhey ||  ||  || April 25, 1998 || La Silla || E. W. Elst || HIL3:2 || align=right | 13 km || 
|-id=339 bgcolor=#d6d6d6
| 31339 ||  || — || May 22, 1998 || Socorro || LINEAR || 2:1J || align=right | 11 km || 
|-id=340 bgcolor=#d6d6d6
| 31340 ||  || — || May 23, 1998 || Socorro || LINEAR || ALA || align=right | 16 km || 
|-id=341 bgcolor=#d6d6d6
| 31341 ||  || — || May 23, 1998 || Socorro || LINEAR || — || align=right | 6.8 km || 
|-id=342 bgcolor=#C2FFFF
| 31342 ||  || — || June 24, 1998 || Socorro || LINEAR || L5 || align=right | 47 km || 
|-id=343 bgcolor=#fefefe
| 31343 || 1998 NT || — || July 12, 1998 || Burlington || T. Handley || H || align=right | 2.4 km || 
|-id=344 bgcolor=#C2FFFF
| 31344 Agathon ||  ||  || July 30, 1998 || Reedy Creek || J. Broughton || L5 || align=right | 41 km || 
|-id=345 bgcolor=#FFC2E0
| 31345 || 1998 PG || — || August 3, 1998 || Anderson Mesa || LONEOS || AMO +1kmmoon || align=right | 1.2 km || 
|-id=346 bgcolor=#FFC2E0
| 31346 ||  || — || August 15, 1998 || Socorro || LINEAR || AMO +1kmmoon || align=right | 1.3 km || 
|-id=347 bgcolor=#fefefe
| 31347 ||  || — || August 28, 1998 || Socorro || LINEAR || FLO || align=right | 2.6 km || 
|-id=348 bgcolor=#fefefe
| 31348 ||  || — || August 28, 1998 || Socorro || LINEAR || H || align=right | 2.0 km || 
|-id=349 bgcolor=#fefefe
| 31349 Uria-Monzon || 1998 SV ||  || September 16, 1998 || Caussols || ODAS || — || align=right | 1.3 km || 
|-id=350 bgcolor=#fefefe
| 31350 ||  || — || September 17, 1998 || Woomera || F. B. Zoltowski || FLO || align=right | 1.8 km || 
|-id=351 bgcolor=#fefefe
| 31351 ||  || — || September 26, 1998 || Socorro || LINEAR || H || align=right | 1.5 km || 
|-id=352 bgcolor=#fefefe
| 31352 ||  || — || September 26, 1998 || Socorro || LINEAR || — || align=right | 1.7 km || 
|-id=353 bgcolor=#fefefe
| 31353 || 1998 TE || — || October 2, 1998 || Gekko || T. Kagawa || V || align=right | 2.2 km || 
|-id=354 bgcolor=#fefefe
| 31354 ||  || — || October 14, 1998 || Socorro || LINEAR || H || align=right | 3.0 km || 
|-id=355 bgcolor=#fefefe
| 31355 ||  || — || October 15, 1998 || Višnjan Observatory || K. Korlević || V || align=right | 4.0 km || 
|-id=356 bgcolor=#fefefe
| 31356 ||  || — || October 12, 1998 || Kitt Peak || Spacewatch || FLO || align=right | 1.5 km || 
|-id=357 bgcolor=#fefefe
| 31357 ||  || — || October 28, 1998 || Višnjan Observatory || K. Korlević || — || align=right | 3.3 km || 
|-id=358 bgcolor=#fefefe
| 31358 ||  || — || October 17, 1998 || Anderson Mesa || LONEOS || — || align=right | 3.3 km || 
|-id=359 bgcolor=#fefefe
| 31359 ||  || — || October 29, 1998 || Socorro || LINEAR || PHO || align=right | 6.4 km || 
|-id=360 bgcolor=#fefefe
| 31360 Huangyihsuan ||  ||  || November 10, 1998 || Socorro || LINEAR || — || align=right | 2.5 km || 
|-id=361 bgcolor=#E9E9E9
| 31361 ||  || — || November 10, 1998 || Socorro || LINEAR || EUN || align=right | 6.9 km || 
|-id=362 bgcolor=#fefefe
| 31362 ||  || — || November 14, 1998 || Kitt Peak || Spacewatch || — || align=right | 2.8 km || 
|-id=363 bgcolor=#fefefe
| 31363 Shulga ||  ||  || November 14, 1998 || Anderson Mesa || LONEOS || NYS || align=right | 1.9 km || 
|-id=364 bgcolor=#fefefe
| 31364 ||  || — || November 24, 1998 || Kleť || Kleť Obs. || — || align=right | 1.8 km || 
|-id=365 bgcolor=#fefefe
| 31365 ||  || — || November 23, 1998 || Oohira || T. Urata || — || align=right | 3.0 km || 
|-id=366 bgcolor=#fefefe
| 31366 ||  || — || November 25, 1998 || Oizumi || T. Kobayashi || V || align=right | 2.5 km || 
|-id=367 bgcolor=#FA8072
| 31367 ||  || — || November 25, 1998 || Socorro || LINEAR || — || align=right | 4.2 km || 
|-id=368 bgcolor=#d6d6d6
| 31368 ||  || — || November 25, 1998 || Socorro || LINEAR || — || align=right | 15 km || 
|-id=369 bgcolor=#fefefe
| 31369 ||  || — || November 16, 1998 || Kitt Peak || Spacewatch || — || align=right | 1.4 km || 
|-id=370 bgcolor=#d6d6d6
| 31370 ||  || — || December 9, 1998 || Oizumi || T. Kobayashi || — || align=right | 8.4 km || 
|-id=371 bgcolor=#fefefe
| 31371 ||  || — || December 15, 1998 || Caussols || ODAS || NYS || align=right | 1.8 km || 
|-id=372 bgcolor=#fefefe
| 31372 ||  || — || December 13, 1998 || Oizumi || T. Kobayashi || — || align=right | 3.7 km || 
|-id=373 bgcolor=#E9E9E9
| 31373 ||  || — || December 14, 1998 || Xinglong || SCAP || — || align=right | 8.8 km || 
|-id=374 bgcolor=#fefefe
| 31374 Hruskova ||  ||  || December 14, 1998 || Socorro || LINEAR || — || align=right | 1.8 km || 
|-id=375 bgcolor=#fefefe
| 31375 Krystufek ||  ||  || December 14, 1998 || Socorro || LINEAR || — || align=right | 2.3 km || 
|-id=376 bgcolor=#fefefe
| 31376 Leobauersfeld ||  ||  || December 14, 1998 || Socorro || LINEAR || — || align=right | 2.4 km || 
|-id=377 bgcolor=#fefefe
| 31377 Kleinwort ||  ||  || December 14, 1998 || Socorro || LINEAR || — || align=right | 5.2 km || 
|-id=378 bgcolor=#fefefe
| 31378 Neidinger ||  ||  || December 14, 1998 || Socorro || LINEAR || NYS || align=right | 2.4 km || 
|-id=379 bgcolor=#E9E9E9
| 31379 ||  || — || December 14, 1998 || Socorro || LINEAR || — || align=right | 6.8 km || 
|-id=380 bgcolor=#fefefe
| 31380 Hegyesi ||  ||  || December 14, 1998 || Socorro || LINEAR || V || align=right | 2.4 km || 
|-id=381 bgcolor=#fefefe
| 31381 ||  || — || December 15, 1998 || Socorro || LINEAR || — || align=right | 6.0 km || 
|-id=382 bgcolor=#E9E9E9
| 31382 ||  || — || December 15, 1998 || Socorro || LINEAR || EUN || align=right | 6.4 km || 
|-id=383 bgcolor=#fefefe
| 31383 ||  || — || December 15, 1998 || Socorro || LINEAR || FLO || align=right | 4.1 km || 
|-id=384 bgcolor=#fefefe
| 31384 ||  || — || December 11, 1998 || Mérida || O. A. Naranjo || — || align=right | 2.2 km || 
|-id=385 bgcolor=#E9E9E9
| 31385 ||  || — || December 11, 1998 || Mérida || O. A. Naranjo || EUN || align=right | 4.9 km || 
|-id=386 bgcolor=#fefefe
| 31386 ||  || — || December 16, 1998 || Gekko || T. Kagawa || — || align=right | 3.0 km || 
|-id=387 bgcolor=#fefefe
| 31387 Lehoucq ||  ||  || December 16, 1998 || Caussols || ODAS || — || align=right | 3.5 km || 
|-id=388 bgcolor=#fefefe
| 31388 ||  || — || December 17, 1998 || Caussols || ODAS || MAS || align=right | 1.9 km || 
|-id=389 bgcolor=#fefefe
| 31389 Alexkaplan ||  ||  || December 17, 1998 || Caussols || ODAS || NYS || align=right | 3.0 km || 
|-id=390 bgcolor=#fefefe
| 31390 ||  || — || December 19, 1998 || Oizumi || T. Kobayashi || — || align=right | 2.2 km || 
|-id=391 bgcolor=#fefefe
| 31391 ||  || — || December 17, 1998 || Caussols || ODAS || — || align=right | 1.8 km || 
|-id=392 bgcolor=#E9E9E9
| 31392 ||  || — || December 20, 1998 || Catalina || CSS || — || align=right | 5.4 km || 
|-id=393 bgcolor=#fefefe
| 31393 ||  || — || December 24, 1998 || Oizumi || T. Kobayashi || — || align=right | 2.2 km || 
|-id=394 bgcolor=#fefefe
| 31394 ||  || — || December 25, 1998 || Višnjan Observatory || K. Korlević, M. Jurić || — || align=right | 1.9 km || 
|-id=395 bgcolor=#fefefe
| 31395 ||  || — || December 18, 1998 || Caussols || ODAS || FLO || align=right | 2.0 km || 
|-id=396 bgcolor=#fefefe
| 31396 ||  || — || December 29, 1998 || Oizumi || T. Kobayashi || V || align=right | 3.0 km || 
|-id=397 bgcolor=#fefefe
| 31397 ||  || — || December 22, 1998 || Kitt Peak || Spacewatch || — || align=right | 3.1 km || 
|-id=398 bgcolor=#fefefe
| 31398 ||  || — || December 27, 1998 || Anderson Mesa || LONEOS || — || align=right | 3.5 km || 
|-id=399 bgcolor=#E9E9E9
| 31399 Susorney ||  ||  || December 24, 1998 || Anderson Mesa || LONEOS || EUNslow || align=right | 7.2 km || 
|-id=400 bgcolor=#fefefe
| 31400 Dakshdua ||  ||  || December 16, 1998 || Socorro || LINEAR || NYS || align=right | 2.5 km || 
|}

31401–31500 

|-bgcolor=#E9E9E9
| 31401 || 1999 AK || — || January 6, 1999 || Višnjan Observatory || K. Korlević || — || align=right | 8.9 km || 
|-id=402 bgcolor=#E9E9E9
| 31402 Negishi || 1999 AR ||  || January 7, 1999 || Oizumi || T. Kobayashi || GER || align=right | 9.6 km || 
|-id=403 bgcolor=#fefefe
| 31403 || 1999 AV || — || January 7, 1999 || Oizumi || T. Kobayashi || — || align=right | 2.9 km || 
|-id=404 bgcolor=#fefefe
| 31404 ||  || — || January 7, 1999 || Kitt Peak || Spacewatch || — || align=right | 1.8 km || 
|-id=405 bgcolor=#fefefe
| 31405 ||  || — || January 9, 1999 || Oizumi || T. Kobayashi || FLO || align=right | 3.3 km || 
|-id=406 bgcolor=#fefefe
| 31406 ||  || — || January 10, 1999 || Oizumi || T. Kobayashi || — || align=right | 3.8 km || 
|-id=407 bgcolor=#E9E9E9
| 31407 ||  || — || January 11, 1999 || Oizumi || T. Kobayashi || — || align=right | 7.1 km || 
|-id=408 bgcolor=#fefefe
| 31408 ||  || — || January 11, 1999 || Oizumi || T. Kobayashi || NYS || align=right | 3.7 km || 
|-id=409 bgcolor=#fefefe
| 31409 ||  || — || January 11, 1999 || Oizumi || T. Kobayashi || FLO || align=right | 4.1 km || 
|-id=410 bgcolor=#fefefe
| 31410 ||  || — || January 12, 1999 || Oizumi || T. Kobayashi || FLO || align=right | 3.4 km || 
|-id=411 bgcolor=#fefefe
| 31411 ||  || — || January 10, 1999 || Xinglong || SCAP || — || align=right | 2.2 km || 
|-id=412 bgcolor=#fefefe
| 31412 ||  || — || January 13, 1999 || Anderson Mesa || LONEOS || — || align=right | 2.6 km || 
|-id=413 bgcolor=#fefefe
| 31413 ||  || — || January 15, 1999 || Višnjan Observatory || K. Korlević || — || align=right | 2.6 km || 
|-id=414 bgcolor=#fefefe
| 31414 Rotarysusa ||  ||  || January 14, 1999 || San Marcello || L. Tesi, A. Boattini || — || align=right | 2.8 km || 
|-id=415 bgcolor=#FA8072
| 31415 ||  || — || January 10, 1999 || Anderson Mesa || LONEOS || — || align=right | 2.0 km || 
|-id=416 bgcolor=#fefefe
| 31416 Peteworden ||  ||  || January 15, 1999 || Caussols || ODAS || NYS || align=right | 2.3 km || 
|-id=417 bgcolor=#fefefe
| 31417 ||  || — || January 15, 1999 || Kitt Peak || Spacewatch || V || align=right | 3.5 km || 
|-id=418 bgcolor=#fefefe
| 31418 Sosaoyarzabal ||  ||  || January 14, 1999 || Anderson Mesa || LONEOS || FLO || align=right | 2.3 km || 
|-id=419 bgcolor=#fefefe
| 31419 ||  || — || January 6, 1999 || Anderson Mesa || LONEOS || — || align=right | 1.6 km || 
|-id=420 bgcolor=#fefefe
| 31420 || 1999 BV || — || January 16, 1999 || Fair Oaks Ranch || J. V. McClusky || FLO || align=right | 1.9 km || 
|-id=421 bgcolor=#E9E9E9
| 31421 || 1999 BZ || — || January 17, 1999 || Catalina || CSS || HNS || align=right | 5.1 km || 
|-id=422 bgcolor=#fefefe
| 31422 ||  || — || January 16, 1999 || High Point || D. K. Chesney || FLO || align=right | 2.1 km || 
|-id=423 bgcolor=#fefefe
| 31423 ||  || — || January 18, 1999 || Oizumi || T. Kobayashi || V || align=right | 2.0 km || 
|-id=424 bgcolor=#fefefe
| 31424 ||  || — || January 18, 1999 || Oizumi || T. Kobayashi || — || align=right | 3.1 km || 
|-id=425 bgcolor=#fefefe
| 31425 ||  || — || January 16, 1999 || Kushiro || S. Ueda, H. Kaneda || — || align=right | 5.1 km || 
|-id=426 bgcolor=#fefefe
| 31426 Davidlouapre ||  ||  || January 19, 1999 || Caussols || ODAS || — || align=right | 3.8 km || 
|-id=427 bgcolor=#fefefe
| 31427 ||  || — || January 20, 1999 || Višnjan Observatory || K. Korlević || MAS || align=right | 2.3 km || 
|-id=428 bgcolor=#fefefe
| 31428 ||  || — || January 20, 1999 || Caussols || ODAS || — || align=right | 3.4 km || 
|-id=429 bgcolor=#fefefe
| 31429 Diegoazzaro ||  ||  || January 21, 1999 || Colleverde || V. S. Casulli || V || align=right | 2.5 km || 
|-id=430 bgcolor=#fefefe
| 31430 ||  || — || January 22, 1999 || Višnjan Observatory || K. Korlević || NYS || align=right | 3.1 km || 
|-id=431 bgcolor=#E9E9E9
| 31431 Cabibbo ||  ||  || January 21, 1999 || Bologna || San Vittore Obs. || — || align=right | 5.7 km || 
|-id=432 bgcolor=#d6d6d6
| 31432 ||  || — || January 24, 1999 || Višnjan Observatory || K. Korlević || — || align=right | 14 km || 
|-id=433 bgcolor=#fefefe
| 31433 ||  || — || January 24, 1999 || Višnjan Observatory || K. Korlević || NYS || align=right | 4.6 km || 
|-id=434 bgcolor=#fefefe
| 31434 ||  || — || January 25, 1999 || Višnjan Observatory || K. Korlević || FLO || align=right | 2.8 km || 
|-id=435 bgcolor=#fefefe
| 31435 Benhauck ||  ||  || January 23, 1999 || Caussols || ODAS || — || align=right | 2.8 km || 
|-id=436 bgcolor=#E9E9E9
| 31436 ||  || — || January 26, 1999 || Višnjan Observatory || K. Korlević || — || align=right | 4.7 km || 
|-id=437 bgcolor=#fefefe
| 31437 Verma ||  ||  || January 16, 1999 || Socorro || LINEAR || — || align=right | 3.0 km || 
|-id=438 bgcolor=#fefefe
| 31438 Yasuhitohayashi ||  ||  || January 16, 1999 || Socorro || LINEAR || — || align=right | 1.8 km || 
|-id=439 bgcolor=#fefefe
| 31439 Mieyamanaka ||  ||  || January 18, 1999 || Socorro || LINEAR || — || align=right | 2.7 km || 
|-id=440 bgcolor=#fefefe
| 31440 ||  || — || January 25, 1999 || Višnjan Observatory || K. Korlević || FLO || align=right | 2.6 km || 
|-id=441 bgcolor=#fefefe
| 31441 ||  || — || January 17, 1999 || Kitt Peak || Spacewatch || — || align=right | 2.5 km || 
|-id=442 bgcolor=#fefefe
| 31442 Stark ||  ||  || February 7, 1999 || Jornada || D. S. Dixon || NYS || align=right | 3.6 km || 
|-id=443 bgcolor=#fefefe
| 31443 ||  || — || February 5, 1999 || Xinglong || SCAP || — || align=right | 2.2 km || 
|-id=444 bgcolor=#fefefe
| 31444 ||  || — || February 9, 1999 || Oaxaca || J. M. Roe || — || align=right | 1.7 km || 
|-id=445 bgcolor=#fefefe
| 31445 ||  || — || February 12, 1999 || Oizumi || T. Kobayashi || — || align=right | 4.6 km || 
|-id=446 bgcolor=#E9E9E9
| 31446 ||  || — || February 12, 1999 || Oizumi || T. Kobayashi || MAR || align=right | 5.3 km || 
|-id=447 bgcolor=#fefefe
| 31447 ||  || — || February 12, 1999 || Višnjan Observatory || K. Korlević || — || align=right | 2.9 km || 
|-id=448 bgcolor=#fefefe
| 31448 ||  || — || February 13, 1999 || High Point || D. K. Chesney || FLO || align=right | 2.5 km || 
|-id=449 bgcolor=#fefefe
| 31449 ||  || — || February 14, 1999 || Oizumi || T. Kobayashi || V || align=right | 2.8 km || 
|-id=450 bgcolor=#fefefe
| 31450 Stevepreston ||  ||  || February 14, 1999 || Reedy Creek || J. Broughton || moon || align=right | 11 km || 
|-id=451 bgcolor=#fefefe
| 31451 Joenickell ||  ||  || February 9, 1999 || Grasslands || J. McGaha || FLO || align=right | 1.9 km || 
|-id=452 bgcolor=#E9E9E9
| 31452 ||  || — || February 14, 1999 || Caussols || ODAS || — || align=right | 6.5 km || 
|-id=453 bgcolor=#E9E9E9
| 31453 Arnaudthiry ||  ||  || February 14, 1999 || Caussols || ODAS || — || align=right | 4.1 km || 
|-id=454 bgcolor=#fefefe
| 31454 ||  || — || February 13, 1999 || Višnjan Observatory || K. Korlević || — || align=right | 3.7 km || 
|-id=455 bgcolor=#E9E9E9
| 31455 ||  || — || February 15, 1999 || Višnjan Observatory || K. Korlević || — || align=right | 9.3 km || 
|-id=456 bgcolor=#d6d6d6
| 31456 ||  || — || February 15, 1999 || Višnjan Observatory || K. Korlević || — || align=right | 5.7 km || 
|-id=457 bgcolor=#fefefe
| 31457 ||  || — || February 15, 1999 || Višnjan Observatory || K. Korlević || NYS || align=right | 2.1 km || 
|-id=458 bgcolor=#E9E9E9
| 31458 Delrosso ||  ||  || February 15, 1999 || San Marcello || L. Tesi, A. Boattini || — || align=right | 5.2 km || 
|-id=459 bgcolor=#E9E9E9
| 31459 ||  || — || February 10, 1999 || Socorro || LINEAR || EUN || align=right | 6.4 km || 
|-id=460 bgcolor=#fefefe
| 31460 Jongsowfei ||  ||  || February 10, 1999 || Socorro || LINEAR || — || align=right | 2.9 km || 
|-id=461 bgcolor=#E9E9E9
| 31461 Shannonlee ||  ||  || February 10, 1999 || Socorro || LINEAR || — || align=right | 4.0 km || 
|-id=462 bgcolor=#fefefe
| 31462 Brchnelova ||  ||  || February 10, 1999 || Socorro || LINEAR || — || align=right | 2.3 km || 
|-id=463 bgcolor=#fefefe
| 31463 Michalgeci ||  ||  || February 10, 1999 || Socorro || LINEAR || — || align=right | 5.5 km || 
|-id=464 bgcolor=#fefefe
| 31464 Liscinsky ||  ||  || February 10, 1999 || Socorro || LINEAR || — || align=right | 5.4 km || 
|-id=465 bgcolor=#fefefe
| 31465 Piyasiri ||  ||  || February 10, 1999 || Socorro || LINEAR || NYS || align=right | 6.7 km || 
|-id=466 bgcolor=#fefefe
| 31466 Abualhassan ||  ||  || February 10, 1999 || Socorro || LINEAR || NYS || align=right | 2.6 km || 
|-id=467 bgcolor=#fefefe
| 31467 ||  || — || February 10, 1999 || Socorro || LINEAR || — || align=right | 2.4 km || 
|-id=468 bgcolor=#fefefe
| 31468 Albastaki ||  ||  || February 10, 1999 || Socorro || LINEAR || NYS || align=right | 1.8 km || 
|-id=469 bgcolor=#fefefe
| 31469 Aizawa ||  ||  || February 10, 1999 || Socorro || LINEAR || — || align=right | 3.5 km || 
|-id=470 bgcolor=#E9E9E9
| 31470 Alagappan ||  ||  || February 10, 1999 || Socorro || LINEAR || — || align=right | 2.7 km || 
|-id=471 bgcolor=#fefefe
| 31471 Sallyalbright ||  ||  || February 10, 1999 || Socorro || LINEAR || FLO || align=right | 3.1 km || 
|-id=472 bgcolor=#fefefe
| 31472 ||  || — || February 10, 1999 || Socorro || LINEAR || — || align=right | 3.4 km || 
|-id=473 bgcolor=#E9E9E9
| 31473 Guangning ||  ||  || February 10, 1999 || Socorro || LINEAR || — || align=right | 3.6 km || 
|-id=474 bgcolor=#fefefe
| 31474 Advaithanand ||  ||  || February 10, 1999 || Socorro || LINEAR || FLO || align=right | 2.5 km || 
|-id=475 bgcolor=#fefefe
| 31475 Robbacchus ||  ||  || February 10, 1999 || Socorro || LINEAR || — || align=right | 3.1 km || 
|-id=476 bgcolor=#fefefe
| 31476 Bocconcelli ||  ||  || February 10, 1999 || Socorro || LINEAR || NYS || align=right | 2.5 km || 
|-id=477 bgcolor=#fefefe
| 31477 Meenakshi ||  ||  || February 10, 1999 || Socorro || LINEAR || FLO || align=right | 2.4 km || 
|-id=478 bgcolor=#fefefe
| 31478 ||  || — || February 10, 1999 || Socorro || LINEAR || — || align=right | 4.0 km || 
|-id=479 bgcolor=#fefefe
| 31479 Botello ||  ||  || February 10, 1999 || Socorro || LINEAR || V || align=right | 3.1 km || 
|-id=480 bgcolor=#fefefe
| 31480 Jonahbutler ||  ||  || February 10, 1999 || Socorro || LINEAR || — || align=right | 6.4 km || 
|-id=481 bgcolor=#d6d6d6
| 31481 ||  || — || February 10, 1999 || Socorro || LINEAR || — || align=right | 7.3 km || 
|-id=482 bgcolor=#E9E9E9
| 31482 Caddell ||  ||  || February 10, 1999 || Socorro || LINEAR || — || align=right | 3.9 km || 
|-id=483 bgcolor=#fefefe
| 31483 Caulfield ||  ||  || February 10, 1999 || Socorro || LINEAR || NYS || align=right | 2.4 km || 
|-id=484 bgcolor=#d6d6d6
| 31484 ||  || — || February 10, 1999 || Socorro || LINEAR || — || align=right | 9.9 km || 
|-id=485 bgcolor=#E9E9E9
| 31485 ||  || — || February 10, 1999 || Socorro || LINEAR || — || align=right | 9.8 km || 
|-id=486 bgcolor=#E9E9E9
| 31486 ||  || — || February 10, 1999 || Socorro || LINEAR || — || align=right | 4.6 km || 
|-id=487 bgcolor=#fefefe
| 31487 Parthchopra ||  ||  || February 10, 1999 || Socorro || LINEAR || FLO || align=right | 6.2 km || 
|-id=488 bgcolor=#E9E9E9
| 31488 ||  || — || February 10, 1999 || Socorro || LINEAR || — || align=right | 7.8 km || 
|-id=489 bgcolor=#fefefe
| 31489 Matthewchun ||  ||  || February 10, 1999 || Socorro || LINEAR || V || align=right | 2.2 km || 
|-id=490 bgcolor=#fefefe
| 31490 Swapnavdeka ||  ||  || February 10, 1999 || Socorro || LINEAR || — || align=right | 3.6 km || 
|-id=491 bgcolor=#fefefe
| 31491 Demessie ||  ||  || February 10, 1999 || Socorro || LINEAR || — || align=right | 2.9 km || 
|-id=492 bgcolor=#fefefe
| 31492 Jennarose ||  ||  || February 10, 1999 || Socorro || LINEAR || FLO || align=right | 2.5 km || 
|-id=493 bgcolor=#E9E9E9
| 31493 Fernando-Peiris ||  ||  || February 10, 1999 || Socorro || LINEAR || — || align=right | 4.2 km || 
|-id=494 bgcolor=#fefefe
| 31494 Emmafreedman ||  ||  || February 12, 1999 || Socorro || LINEAR || — || align=right | 3.8 km || 
|-id=495 bgcolor=#fefefe
| 31495 Sarahgalvin ||  ||  || February 12, 1999 || Socorro || LINEAR || NYS || align=right | 5.3 km || 
|-id=496 bgcolor=#fefefe
| 31496 Glowacz ||  ||  || February 12, 1999 || Socorro || LINEAR || — || align=right | 3.4 km || 
|-id=497 bgcolor=#E9E9E9
| 31497 ||  || — || February 12, 1999 || Socorro || LINEAR || EUN || align=right | 4.6 km || 
|-id=498 bgcolor=#E9E9E9
| 31498 ||  || — || February 12, 1999 || Socorro || LINEAR || — || align=right | 13 km || 
|-id=499 bgcolor=#d6d6d6
| 31499 ||  || — || February 12, 1999 || Socorro || LINEAR || URS || align=right | 15 km || 
|-id=500 bgcolor=#fefefe
| 31500 Grutzik ||  ||  || February 12, 1999 || Socorro || LINEAR || FLO || align=right | 2.7 km || 
|}

31501–31600 

|-bgcolor=#fefefe
| 31501 Williamhang ||  ||  || February 12, 1999 || Socorro || LINEAR || — || align=right | 2.1 km || 
|-id=502 bgcolor=#fefefe
| 31502 Hellerstein ||  ||  || February 12, 1999 || Socorro || LINEAR || — || align=right | 3.0 km || 
|-id=503 bgcolor=#E9E9E9
| 31503 Jessicahong ||  ||  || February 12, 1999 || Socorro || LINEAR || — || align=right | 3.0 km || 
|-id=504 bgcolor=#fefefe
| 31504 Jaisonjain ||  ||  || February 12, 1999 || Socorro || LINEAR || V || align=right | 2.3 km || 
|-id=505 bgcolor=#fefefe
| 31505 ||  || — || February 12, 1999 || Socorro || LINEAR || NYS || align=right | 9.0 km || 
|-id=506 bgcolor=#fefefe
| 31506 ||  || — || February 12, 1999 || Socorro || LINEAR || — || align=right | 5.1 km || 
|-id=507 bgcolor=#fefefe
| 31507 Williamjin ||  ||  || February 12, 1999 || Socorro || LINEAR || FLO || align=right | 4.6 km || 
|-id=508 bgcolor=#fefefe
| 31508 Kanevsky ||  ||  || February 10, 1999 || Socorro || LINEAR || — || align=right | 4.0 km || 
|-id=509 bgcolor=#fefefe
| 31509 ||  || — || February 10, 1999 || Socorro || LINEAR || — || align=right | 2.4 km || 
|-id=510 bgcolor=#fefefe
| 31510 Saumya ||  ||  || February 10, 1999 || Socorro || LINEAR || — || align=right | 4.1 km || 
|-id=511 bgcolor=#E9E9E9
| 31511 Jessicakim ||  ||  || February 10, 1999 || Socorro || LINEAR || — || align=right | 2.9 km || 
|-id=512 bgcolor=#E9E9E9
| 31512 Koyyalagunta ||  ||  || February 10, 1999 || Socorro || LINEAR || — || align=right | 3.3 km || 
|-id=513 bgcolor=#fefefe
| 31513 Lafazan ||  ||  || February 10, 1999 || Socorro || LINEAR || V || align=right | 2.8 km || 
|-id=514 bgcolor=#fefefe
| 31514 ||  || — || February 10, 1999 || Socorro || LINEAR || — || align=right | 4.1 km || 
|-id=515 bgcolor=#E9E9E9
| 31515 ||  || — || February 10, 1999 || Socorro || LINEAR || — || align=right | 5.7 km || 
|-id=516 bgcolor=#fefefe
| 31516 Leibowitz ||  ||  || February 10, 1999 || Socorro || LINEAR || — || align=right | 3.5 km || 
|-id=517 bgcolor=#fefefe
| 31517 Mahoui ||  ||  || February 12, 1999 || Socorro || LINEAR || V || align=right | 3.3 km || 
|-id=518 bgcolor=#E9E9E9
| 31518 ||  || — || February 12, 1999 || Socorro || LINEAR || EUN || align=right | 4.9 km || 
|-id=519 bgcolor=#fefefe
| 31519 Mimamarquez ||  ||  || February 12, 1999 || Socorro || LINEAR || V || align=right | 2.1 km || 
|-id=520 bgcolor=#E9E9E9
| 31520 ||  || — || February 12, 1999 || Socorro || LINEAR || — || align=right | 3.2 km || 
|-id=521 bgcolor=#E9E9E9
| 31521 ||  || — || February 12, 1999 || Socorro || LINEAR || EUN || align=right | 4.7 km || 
|-id=522 bgcolor=#fefefe
| 31522 McCutchen ||  ||  || February 12, 1999 || Socorro || LINEAR || — || align=right | 2.0 km || 
|-id=523 bgcolor=#E9E9E9
| 31523 Jessemichel ||  ||  || February 12, 1999 || Socorro || LINEAR || — || align=right | 3.5 km || 
|-id=524 bgcolor=#E9E9E9
| 31524 ||  || — || February 12, 1999 || Socorro || LINEAR || — || align=right | 4.1 km || 
|-id=525 bgcolor=#fefefe
| 31525 Nickmiller ||  ||  || February 12, 1999 || Socorro || LINEAR || — || align=right | 3.0 km || 
|-id=526 bgcolor=#E9E9E9
| 31526 ||  || — || February 11, 1999 || Socorro || LINEAR || — || align=right | 8.0 km || 
|-id=527 bgcolor=#E9E9E9
| 31527 ||  || — || February 11, 1999 || Socorro || LINEAR || — || align=right | 4.4 km || 
|-id=528 bgcolor=#fefefe
| 31528 ||  || — || February 11, 1999 || Socorro || LINEAR || PHO || align=right | 3.3 km || 
|-id=529 bgcolor=#E9E9E9
| 31529 ||  || — || February 11, 1999 || Socorro || LINEAR || HNS || align=right | 5.3 km || 
|-id=530 bgcolor=#E9E9E9
| 31530 ||  || — || February 11, 1999 || Socorro || LINEAR || EUN || align=right | 5.1 km || 
|-id=531 bgcolor=#d6d6d6
| 31531 ARRL ||  ||  || February 9, 1999 || Kitt Peak || Spacewatch || — || align=right | 6.5 km || 
|-id=532 bgcolor=#E9E9E9
| 31532 ||  || — || February 9, 1999 || Kitt Peak || Spacewatch || — || align=right | 4.7 km || 
|-id=533 bgcolor=#E9E9E9
| 31533 ||  || — || February 10, 1999 || Kitt Peak || Spacewatch || — || align=right | 2.2 km || 
|-id=534 bgcolor=#E9E9E9
| 31534 ||  || — || February 13, 1999 || Kitt Peak || Spacewatch || — || align=right | 2.7 km || 
|-id=535 bgcolor=#E9E9E9
| 31535 ||  || — || February 13, 1999 || Kitt Peak || Spacewatch || — || align=right | 4.8 km || 
|-id=536 bgcolor=#d6d6d6
| 31536 ||  || — || February 8, 1999 || Kitt Peak || Spacewatch || — || align=right | 3.9 km || 
|-id=537 bgcolor=#fefefe
| 31537 || 1999 DZ || — || February 18, 1999 || Višnjan Observatory || K. Korlević || — || align=right | 2.5 km || 
|-id=538 bgcolor=#fefefe
| 31538 ||  || — || February 17, 1999 || Socorro || LINEAR || — || align=right | 2.3 km || 
|-id=539 bgcolor=#d6d6d6
| 31539 ||  || — || February 18, 1999 || Haleakala || NEAT || — || align=right | 21 km || 
|-id=540 bgcolor=#E9E9E9
| 31540 ||  || — || February 19, 1999 || Oizumi || T. Kobayashi || MAR || align=right | 8.0 km || 
|-id=541 bgcolor=#fefefe
| 31541 ||  || — || February 21, 1999 || Oizumi || T. Kobayashi || — || align=right | 2.7 km || 
|-id=542 bgcolor=#d6d6d6
| 31542 ||  || — || February 20, 1999 || Nachi-Katsuura || Y. Shimizu, T. Urata || EOS || align=right | 12 km || 
|-id=543 bgcolor=#E9E9E9
| 31543 ||  || — || February 17, 1999 || Socorro || LINEAR || — || align=right | 4.4 km || 
|-id=544 bgcolor=#E9E9E9
| 31544 ||  || — || February 17, 1999 || Socorro || LINEAR || — || align=right | 5.4 km || 
|-id=545 bgcolor=#E9E9E9
| 31545 ||  || — || February 20, 1999 || Socorro || LINEAR || — || align=right | 5.5 km || 
|-id=546 bgcolor=#E9E9E9
| 31546 ||  || — || February 20, 1999 || Socorro || LINEAR || — || align=right | 10 km || 
|-id=547 bgcolor=#E9E9E9
| 31547 ||  || — || February 20, 1999 || Socorro || LINEAR || — || align=right | 13 km || 
|-id=548 bgcolor=#E9E9E9
| 31548 ||  || — || February 20, 1999 || Socorro || LINEAR || — || align=right | 7.2 km || 
|-id=549 bgcolor=#E9E9E9
| 31549 ||  || — || February 23, 1999 || Socorro || LINEAR || — || align=right | 5.7 km || 
|-id=550 bgcolor=#fefefe
| 31550 ||  || — || February 18, 1999 || Anderson Mesa || LONEOS || — || align=right | 2.6 km || 
|-id=551 bgcolor=#fefefe
| 31551 ||  || — || February 18, 1999 || Anderson Mesa || LONEOS || — || align=right | 2.9 km || 
|-id=552 bgcolor=#E9E9E9
| 31552 || 1999 EJ || — || March 7, 1999 || Reedy Creek || J. Broughton || — || align=right | 4.7 km || 
|-id=553 bgcolor=#E9E9E9
| 31553 ||  || — || March 9, 1999 || Kitt Peak || Spacewatch || — || align=right | 3.1 km || 
|-id=554 bgcolor=#E9E9E9
| 31554 ||  || — || March 9, 1999 || Kitt Peak || Spacewatch || MAR || align=right | 7.5 km || 
|-id=555 bgcolor=#fefefe
| 31555 Wheeler ||  ||  || March 7, 1999 || Gnosca || S. Sposetti || V || align=right | 2.1 km || 
|-id=556 bgcolor=#E9E9E9
| 31556 Shatner ||  ||  || March 13, 1999 || Goodricke-Pigott || R. A. Tucker || VIB || align=right | 5.8 km || 
|-id=557 bgcolor=#E9E9E9
| 31557 Holleybakich ||  ||  || March 13, 1999 || Goodricke-Pigott || R. A. Tucker || GEF || align=right | 3.3 km || 
|-id=558 bgcolor=#fefefe
| 31558 ||  || — || March 12, 1999 || Kitt Peak || Spacewatch || — || align=right | 2.1 km || 
|-id=559 bgcolor=#fefefe
| 31559 Alonmillet ||  ||  || March 15, 1999 || Socorro || LINEAR || FLO || align=right | 1.9 km || 
|-id=560 bgcolor=#fefefe
| 31560 ||  || — || March 11, 1999 || Kitt Peak || Spacewatch || — || align=right | 5.5 km || 
|-id=561 bgcolor=#fefefe
| 31561 ||  || — || March 21, 1999 || Farra d'Isonzo || Farra d'Isonzo || — || align=right | 3.1 km || 
|-id=562 bgcolor=#fefefe
| 31562 ||  || — || March 19, 1999 || Caussols || ODAS || — || align=right | 2.1 km || 
|-id=563 bgcolor=#fefefe
| 31563 ||  || — || March 19, 1999 || Anderson Mesa || LONEOS || NYS || align=right | 7.1 km || 
|-id=564 bgcolor=#fefefe
| 31564 ||  || — || March 20, 1999 || Anderson Mesa || LONEOS || FLO || align=right | 3.9 km || 
|-id=565 bgcolor=#fefefe
| 31565 ||  || — || March 22, 1999 || Anderson Mesa || LONEOS || — || align=right | 3.5 km || 
|-id=566 bgcolor=#E9E9E9
| 31566 ||  || — || March 22, 1999 || Anderson Mesa || LONEOS || — || align=right | 4.6 km || 
|-id=567 bgcolor=#E9E9E9
| 31567 ||  || — || March 22, 1999 || Anderson Mesa || LONEOS || — || align=right | 4.3 km || 
|-id=568 bgcolor=#fefefe
| 31568 ||  || — || March 19, 1999 || Kitt Peak || Spacewatch || — || align=right | 2.5 km || 
|-id=569 bgcolor=#fefefe
| 31569 Adriansonka ||  ||  || March 22, 1999 || Anderson Mesa || LONEOS || V || align=right | 4.1 km || 
|-id=570 bgcolor=#E9E9E9
| 31570 ||  || — || March 22, 1999 || Anderson Mesa || LONEOS || — || align=right | 7.4 km || 
|-id=571 bgcolor=#E9E9E9
| 31571 ||  || — || March 25, 1999 || Kleť || Kleť Obs. || — || align=right | 2.7 km || 
|-id=572 bgcolor=#fefefe
| 31572 ||  || — || March 19, 1999 || Socorro || LINEAR || — || align=right | 5.0 km || 
|-id=573 bgcolor=#fefefe
| 31573 Mohanty ||  ||  || March 19, 1999 || Socorro || LINEAR || — || align=right | 2.8 km || 
|-id=574 bgcolor=#fefefe
| 31574 Moshova ||  ||  || March 19, 1999 || Socorro || LINEAR || — || align=right | 2.3 km || 
|-id=575 bgcolor=#fefefe
| 31575 Nikhilmurthy ||  ||  || March 19, 1999 || Socorro || LINEAR || V || align=right | 1.8 km || 
|-id=576 bgcolor=#E9E9E9
| 31576 Nandigala ||  ||  || March 19, 1999 || Socorro || LINEAR || — || align=right | 2.8 km || 
|-id=577 bgcolor=#E9E9E9
| 31577 ||  || — || March 19, 1999 || Socorro || LINEAR || — || align=right | 6.0 km || 
|-id=578 bgcolor=#E9E9E9
| 31578 ||  || — || March 19, 1999 || Socorro || LINEAR || AGN || align=right | 4.0 km || 
|-id=579 bgcolor=#d6d6d6
| 31579 ||  || — || March 19, 1999 || Socorro || LINEAR || HYG || align=right | 8.0 km || 
|-id=580 bgcolor=#fefefe
| 31580 Bridgetoei ||  ||  || March 19, 1999 || Socorro || LINEAR || — || align=right | 3.0 km || 
|-id=581 bgcolor=#fefefe
| 31581 Onnink ||  ||  || March 19, 1999 || Socorro || LINEAR || FLO || align=right | 4.6 km || 
|-id=582 bgcolor=#E9E9E9
| 31582 Miraeparker ||  ||  || March 19, 1999 || Socorro || LINEAR || — || align=right | 3.7 km || 
|-id=583 bgcolor=#d6d6d6
| 31583 ||  || — || March 19, 1999 || Socorro || LINEAR || HYG || align=right | 11 km || 
|-id=584 bgcolor=#fefefe
| 31584 Emaparker ||  ||  || March 19, 1999 || Socorro || LINEAR || V || align=right | 2.9 km || 
|-id=585 bgcolor=#E9E9E9
| 31585 ||  || — || March 19, 1999 || Socorro || LINEAR || ADE || align=right | 9.0 km || 
|-id=586 bgcolor=#d6d6d6
| 31586 ||  || — || March 19, 1999 || Socorro || LINEAR || — || align=right | 6.9 km || 
|-id=587 bgcolor=#fefefe
| 31587 ||  || — || March 23, 1999 || Višnjan Observatory || K. Korlević || NYS || align=right | 2.8 km || 
|-id=588 bgcolor=#E9E9E9
| 31588 Harrypaul ||  ||  || March 19, 1999 || Socorro || LINEAR || HOF || align=right | 5.7 km || 
|-id=589 bgcolor=#d6d6d6
| 31589 ||  || — || March 19, 1999 || Socorro || LINEAR || — || align=right | 9.0 km || 
|-id=590 bgcolor=#E9E9E9
| 31590 ||  || — || March 19, 1999 || Socorro || LINEAR || — || align=right | 7.4 km || 
|-id=591 bgcolor=#d6d6d6
| 31591 ||  || — || March 19, 1999 || Socorro || LINEAR || THM || align=right | 7.6 km || 
|-id=592 bgcolor=#fefefe
| 31592 Jacobplaut ||  ||  || March 20, 1999 || Socorro || LINEAR || — || align=right | 3.5 km || 
|-id=593 bgcolor=#fefefe
| 31593 Romapradhan ||  ||  || March 20, 1999 || Socorro || LINEAR || — || align=right | 2.4 km || 
|-id=594 bgcolor=#fefefe
| 31594 Drewprevost ||  ||  || March 20, 1999 || Socorro || LINEAR || — || align=right | 5.0 km || 
|-id=595 bgcolor=#fefefe
| 31595 Noahpritt ||  ||  || March 20, 1999 || Socorro || LINEAR || — || align=right | 2.9 km || 
|-id=596 bgcolor=#fefefe
| 31596 Ragavender ||  ||  || March 20, 1999 || Socorro || LINEAR || MAS || align=right | 2.3 km || 
|-id=597 bgcolor=#fefefe
| 31597 Allisonmarie ||  ||  || March 20, 1999 || Socorro || LINEAR || V || align=right | 2.3 km || 
|-id=598 bgcolor=#fefefe
| 31598 Danielrudin ||  ||  || March 20, 1999 || Socorro || LINEAR || V || align=right | 2.8 km || 
|-id=599 bgcolor=#fefefe
| 31599 Chloesherry ||  ||  || March 20, 1999 || Socorro || LINEAR || — || align=right | 4.1 km || 
|-id=600 bgcolor=#E9E9E9
| 31600 Somasundaram ||  ||  || March 20, 1999 || Socorro || LINEAR || MRX || align=right | 3.0 km || 
|}

31601–31700 

|-bgcolor=#E9E9E9
| 31601 || 1999 GF || — || April 3, 1999 || Višnjan Observatory || K. Korlević || MAR || align=right | 5.8 km || 
|-id=602 bgcolor=#d6d6d6
| 31602 || 1999 GG || — || April 3, 1999 || Višnjan Observatory || K. Korlević || THM || align=right | 8.1 km || 
|-id=603 bgcolor=#E9E9E9
| 31603 ||  || — || April 10, 1999 || Fountain Hills || C. W. Juels || — || align=right | 5.5 km || 
|-id=604 bgcolor=#fefefe
| 31604 ||  || — || April 13, 1999 || Oaxaca || J. M. Roe || V || align=right | 3.5 km || 
|-id=605 bgcolor=#E9E9E9
| 31605 Braschi ||  ||  || April 10, 1999 || Montelupo || M. Tombelli, A. Boattini || — || align=right | 8.8 km || 
|-id=606 bgcolor=#E9E9E9
| 31606 ||  || — || April 13, 1999 || Woomera || F. B. Zoltowski || — || align=right | 2.4 km || 
|-id=607 bgcolor=#E9E9E9
| 31607 ||  || — || April 15, 1999 || Gekko || T. Kagawa || HEN || align=right | 4.2 km || 
|-id=608 bgcolor=#d6d6d6
| 31608 ||  || — || April 12, 1999 || Reedy Creek || J. Broughton || EOS || align=right | 5.8 km || 
|-id=609 bgcolor=#d6d6d6
| 31609 ||  || — || April 15, 1999 || Fountain Hills || C. W. Juels || THM || align=right | 10 km || 
|-id=610 bgcolor=#E9E9E9
| 31610 ||  || — || April 14, 1999 || Nachi-Katsuura || Y. Shimizu, T. Urata || MAR || align=right | 7.3 km || 
|-id=611 bgcolor=#fefefe
| 31611 ||  || — || April 13, 1999 || Višnjan Observatory || K. Korlević || V || align=right | 2.9 km || 
|-id=612 bgcolor=#E9E9E9
| 31612 ||  || — || April 13, 1999 || Višnjan Observatory || K. Korlević || GEF || align=right | 3.7 km || 
|-id=613 bgcolor=#E9E9E9
| 31613 ||  || — || April 10, 1999 || Anderson Mesa || LONEOS || — || align=right | 3.1 km || 
|-id=614 bgcolor=#d6d6d6
| 31614 ||  || — || April 11, 1999 || Kitt Peak || Spacewatch || THM || align=right | 9.6 km || 
|-id=615 bgcolor=#d6d6d6
| 31615 ||  || — || April 9, 1999 || Socorro || LINEAR || — || align=right | 7.5 km || 
|-id=616 bgcolor=#d6d6d6
| 31616 ||  || — || April 15, 1999 || Socorro || LINEAR || EOS || align=right | 8.9 km || 
|-id=617 bgcolor=#fefefe
| 31617 Meeraradha ||  ||  || April 15, 1999 || Socorro || LINEAR || — || align=right | 3.2 km || 
|-id=618 bgcolor=#fefefe
| 31618 Tharakan ||  ||  || April 15, 1999 || Socorro || LINEAR || — || align=right | 2.2 km || 
|-id=619 bgcolor=#fefefe
| 31619 Jodietinker ||  ||  || April 15, 1999 || Socorro || LINEAR || — || align=right | 2.7 km || 
|-id=620 bgcolor=#fefefe
| 31620 ||  || — || April 15, 1999 || Socorro || LINEAR || — || align=right | 6.1 km || 
|-id=621 bgcolor=#d6d6d6
| 31621 ||  || — || April 15, 1999 || Socorro || LINEAR || — || align=right | 5.8 km || 
|-id=622 bgcolor=#fefefe
| 31622 ||  || — || April 15, 1999 || Socorro || LINEAR || V || align=right | 3.8 km || 
|-id=623 bgcolor=#E9E9E9
| 31623 ||  || — || April 15, 1999 || Socorro || LINEAR || — || align=right | 8.3 km || 
|-id=624 bgcolor=#E9E9E9
| 31624 ||  || — || April 15, 1999 || Socorro || LINEAR || — || align=right | 8.4 km || 
|-id=625 bgcolor=#E9E9E9
| 31625 ||  || — || April 15, 1999 || Socorro || LINEAR || — || align=right | 5.6 km || 
|-id=626 bgcolor=#d6d6d6
| 31626 ||  || — || April 15, 1999 || Socorro || LINEAR || CRO || align=right | 8.9 km || 
|-id=627 bgcolor=#fefefe
| 31627 Ulmera ||  ||  || April 15, 1999 || Socorro || LINEAR || V || align=right | 2.8 km || 
|-id=628 bgcolor=#E9E9E9
| 31628 Vorperian ||  ||  || April 6, 1999 || Socorro || LINEAR || — || align=right | 2.9 km || 
|-id=629 bgcolor=#fefefe
| 31629 ||  || — || April 6, 1999 || Socorro || LINEAR || — || align=right | 2.1 km || 
|-id=630 bgcolor=#E9E9E9
| 31630 Jennywang ||  ||  || April 6, 1999 || Socorro || LINEAR || — || align=right | 4.3 km || 
|-id=631 bgcolor=#fefefe
| 31631 Abbywilliams ||  ||  || April 7, 1999 || Socorro || LINEAR || — || align=right | 4.8 km || 
|-id=632 bgcolor=#E9E9E9
| 31632 Stephaying ||  ||  || April 7, 1999 || Socorro || LINEAR || — || align=right | 6.3 km || 
|-id=633 bgcolor=#d6d6d6
| 31633 Almonte ||  ||  || April 7, 1999 || Socorro || LINEAR || THM || align=right | 5.9 km || 
|-id=634 bgcolor=#d6d6d6
| 31634 ||  || — || April 7, 1999 || Socorro || LINEAR || — || align=right | 6.3 km || 
|-id=635 bgcolor=#d6d6d6
| 31635 Anandarao ||  ||  || April 7, 1999 || Socorro || LINEAR || — || align=right | 4.2 km || 
|-id=636 bgcolor=#d6d6d6
| 31636 ||  || — || April 7, 1999 || Socorro || LINEAR || — || align=right | 9.4 km || 
|-id=637 bgcolor=#E9E9E9
| 31637 Bhimaraju ||  ||  || April 7, 1999 || Socorro || LINEAR || — || align=right | 2.3 km || 
|-id=638 bgcolor=#E9E9E9
| 31638 ||  || — || April 7, 1999 || Socorro || LINEAR || — || align=right | 5.5 km || 
|-id=639 bgcolor=#fefefe
| 31639 Bodoni ||  ||  || April 6, 1999 || Socorro || LINEAR || — || align=right | 2.6 km || 
|-id=640 bgcolor=#E9E9E9
| 31640 Johncaven ||  ||  || April 6, 1999 || Socorro || LINEAR || — || align=right | 3.1 km || 
|-id=641 bgcolor=#fefefe
| 31641 Cevasco ||  ||  || April 6, 1999 || Socorro || LINEAR || NYS || align=right | 2.7 km || 
|-id=642 bgcolor=#E9E9E9
| 31642 Soyounchoi ||  ||  || April 14, 1999 || Socorro || LINEAR || MIS || align=right | 6.2 km || 
|-id=643 bgcolor=#fefefe
| 31643 Natashachugh ||  ||  || April 12, 1999 || Socorro || LINEAR || FLO || align=right | 2.8 km || 
|-id=644 bgcolor=#fefefe
| 31644 ||  || — || April 12, 1999 || Socorro || LINEAR || — || align=right | 3.3 km || 
|-id=645 bgcolor=#E9E9E9
| 31645 ||  || — || April 12, 1999 || Socorro || LINEAR || — || align=right | 11 km || 
|-id=646 bgcolor=#d6d6d6
| 31646 ||  || — || April 12, 1999 || Socorro || LINEAR || EOS || align=right | 8.4 km || 
|-id=647 bgcolor=#fefefe
| 31647 ||  || — || April 11, 1999 || Anderson Mesa || LONEOS || — || align=right | 2.7 km || 
|-id=648 bgcolor=#E9E9E9
| 31648 Pedrosada ||  ||  || April 11, 1999 || Anderson Mesa || LONEOS || EUN || align=right | 4.5 km || 
|-id=649 bgcolor=#d6d6d6
| 31649 ||  || — || April 7, 1999 || Kitt Peak || Spacewatch || KOR || align=right | 6.0 km || 
|-id=650 bgcolor=#E9E9E9
| 31650 Frýdek-Místek || 1999 HW ||  || April 18, 1999 || Ondřejov || P. Pravec || — || align=right | 8.7 km || 
|-id=651 bgcolor=#fefefe
| 31651 ||  || — || April 19, 1999 || Majorca || Á. López J., R. Pacheco || — || align=right | 3.6 km || 
|-id=652 bgcolor=#fefefe
| 31652 ||  || — || April 21, 1999 || Xinglong || SCAP || NYS || align=right | 3.2 km || 
|-id=653 bgcolor=#d6d6d6
| 31653 ||  || — || April 16, 1999 || Kitt Peak || Spacewatch || THM || align=right | 5.7 km || 
|-id=654 bgcolor=#fefefe
| 31654 ||  || — || April 17, 1999 || Kitt Peak || Spacewatch || — || align=right | 3.4 km || 
|-id=655 bgcolor=#E9E9E9
| 31655 Averyclowes ||  ||  || April 17, 1999 || Socorro || LINEAR || — || align=right | 7.4 km || 
|-id=656 bgcolor=#d6d6d6
| 31656 ||  || — || April 16, 1999 || Socorro || LINEAR || EOS || align=right | 11 km || 
|-id=657 bgcolor=#fefefe
| 31657 ||  || — || April 16, 1999 || Socorro || LINEAR || — || align=right | 3.1 km || 
|-id=658 bgcolor=#d6d6d6
| 31658 ||  || — || April 17, 1999 || Socorro || LINEAR || EOS || align=right | 5.9 km || 
|-id=659 bgcolor=#d6d6d6
| 31659 ||  || — || April 17, 1999 || Socorro || LINEAR || HYG || align=right | 9.7 km || 
|-id=660 bgcolor=#fefefe
| 31660 Maximiliandu ||  ||  || April 17, 1999 || Socorro || LINEAR || — || align=right | 2.5 km || 
|-id=661 bgcolor=#fefefe
| 31661 Eggebraaten ||  ||  || April 17, 1999 || Socorro || LINEAR || — || align=right | 3.0 km || 
|-id=662 bgcolor=#FFC2E0
| 31662 ||  || — || April 19, 1999 || Kitt Peak || Spacewatch || APO || align=right data-sort-value="0.47" | 470 m || 
|-id=663 bgcolor=#fefefe
| 31663 ||  || — || May 8, 1999 || Catalina || CSS || V || align=right | 2.2 km || 
|-id=664 bgcolor=#E9E9E9
| 31664 Randiiwessen ||  ||  || May 8, 1999 || Farpoint || G. Hug || MAR || align=right | 5.5 km || 
|-id=665 bgcolor=#d6d6d6
| 31665 Veblen ||  ||  || May 10, 1999 || Prescott || P. G. Comba || THM || align=right | 6.3 km || 
|-id=666 bgcolor=#E9E9E9
| 31666 ||  || — || May 8, 1999 || Oizumi || T. Kobayashi || EUN || align=right | 5.9 km || 
|-id=667 bgcolor=#fefefe
| 31667 ||  || — || May 8, 1999 || Oizumi || T. Kobayashi || PHO || align=right | 3.3 km || 
|-id=668 bgcolor=#d6d6d6
| 31668 ||  || — || May 6, 1999 || Woomera || F. B. Zoltowski || EOS || align=right | 8.8 km || 
|-id=669 bgcolor=#FFC2E0
| 31669 ||  || — || May 12, 1999 || Socorro || LINEAR || APO +1kmPHA || align=right | 2.4 km || 
|-id=670 bgcolor=#d6d6d6
| 31670 ||  || — || May 8, 1999 || Catalina || CSS || — || align=right | 4.9 km || 
|-id=671 bgcolor=#d6d6d6
| 31671 Masatoshi ||  ||  || May 13, 1999 || Kuma Kogen || A. Nakamura || — || align=right | 6.3 km || 
|-id=672 bgcolor=#fefefe
| 31672 ||  || — || May 12, 1999 || Socorro || LINEAR || — || align=right | 3.8 km || 
|-id=673 bgcolor=#fefefe
| 31673 ||  || — || May 7, 1999 || Catalina || CSS || — || align=right | 8.7 km || 
|-id=674 bgcolor=#d6d6d6
| 31674 ||  || — || May 7, 1999 || Catalina || CSS || — || align=right | 5.5 km || 
|-id=675 bgcolor=#d6d6d6
| 31675 ||  || — || May 8, 1999 || Catalina || CSS || — || align=right | 8.5 km || 
|-id=676 bgcolor=#E9E9E9
| 31676 ||  || — || May 15, 1999 || Kitt Peak || Spacewatch || AGN || align=right | 3.5 km || 
|-id=677 bgcolor=#fefefe
| 31677 Audreyglende ||  ||  || May 10, 1999 || Socorro || LINEAR || — || align=right | 2.9 km || 
|-id=678 bgcolor=#fefefe
| 31678 ||  || — || May 10, 1999 || Socorro || LINEAR || V || align=right | 3.0 km || 
|-id=679 bgcolor=#E9E9E9
| 31679 Glenngrimmett ||  ||  || May 10, 1999 || Socorro || LINEAR || — || align=right | 3.2 km || 
|-id=680 bgcolor=#E9E9E9
| 31680 Josephuitt ||  ||  || May 10, 1999 || Socorro || LINEAR || — || align=right | 3.2 km || 
|-id=681 bgcolor=#E9E9E9
| 31681 ||  || — || May 10, 1999 || Socorro || LINEAR || — || align=right | 7.3 km || 
|-id=682 bgcolor=#fefefe
| 31682 Kinsey ||  ||  || May 10, 1999 || Socorro || LINEAR || — || align=right | 3.7 km || 
|-id=683 bgcolor=#E9E9E9
| 31683 ||  || — || May 10, 1999 || Socorro || LINEAR || WIT || align=right | 4.1 km || 
|-id=684 bgcolor=#E9E9E9
| 31684 Lindsay ||  ||  || May 10, 1999 || Socorro || LINEAR || — || align=right | 7.8 km || 
|-id=685 bgcolor=#E9E9E9
| 31685 ||  || — || May 10, 1999 || Socorro || LINEAR || EUN || align=right | 8.4 km || 
|-id=686 bgcolor=#E9E9E9
| 31686 ||  || — || May 10, 1999 || Socorro || LINEAR || — || align=right | 5.2 km || 
|-id=687 bgcolor=#d6d6d6
| 31687 ||  || — || May 10, 1999 || Socorro || LINEAR || — || align=right | 8.3 km || 
|-id=688 bgcolor=#E9E9E9
| 31688 Bryantliu ||  ||  || May 10, 1999 || Socorro || LINEAR || — || align=right | 8.1 km || 
|-id=689 bgcolor=#d6d6d6
| 31689 Sebmellen ||  ||  || May 10, 1999 || Socorro || LINEAR || THM || align=right | 7.3 km || 
|-id=690 bgcolor=#d6d6d6
| 31690 Nayamenezes ||  ||  || May 10, 1999 || Socorro || LINEAR || THM || align=right | 7.0 km || 
|-id=691 bgcolor=#d6d6d6
| 31691 ||  || — || May 10, 1999 || Socorro || LINEAR || EOS || align=right | 5.3 km || 
|-id=692 bgcolor=#fefefe
| 31692 ||  || — || May 10, 1999 || Socorro || LINEAR || — || align=right | 3.7 km || 
|-id=693 bgcolor=#E9E9E9
| 31693 ||  || — || May 10, 1999 || Socorro || LINEAR || EUN || align=right | 5.1 km || 
|-id=694 bgcolor=#d6d6d6
| 31694 ||  || — || May 10, 1999 || Socorro || LINEAR || — || align=right | 9.1 km || 
|-id=695 bgcolor=#E9E9E9
| 31695 ||  || — || May 10, 1999 || Socorro || LINEAR || — || align=right | 11 km || 
|-id=696 bgcolor=#E9E9E9
| 31696 Rohitmital ||  ||  || May 10, 1999 || Socorro || LINEAR || — || align=right | 7.9 km || 
|-id=697 bgcolor=#E9E9E9
| 31697 Isaiahoneal ||  ||  || May 10, 1999 || Socorro || LINEAR || AGN || align=right | 3.9 km || 
|-id=698 bgcolor=#d6d6d6
| 31698 Nikolaiortiz ||  ||  || May 10, 1999 || Socorro || LINEAR || KOR || align=right | 4.1 km || 
|-id=699 bgcolor=#d6d6d6
| 31699 ||  || — || May 10, 1999 || Socorro || LINEAR || — || align=right | 11 km || 
|-id=700 bgcolor=#d6d6d6
| 31700 Naperez ||  ||  || May 10, 1999 || Socorro || LINEAR || THM || align=right | 7.0 km || 
|}

31701–31800 

|-bgcolor=#E9E9E9
| 31701 Ragula ||  ||  || May 10, 1999 || Socorro || LINEAR || — || align=right | 6.3 km || 
|-id=702 bgcolor=#E9E9E9
| 31702 ||  || — || May 10, 1999 || Socorro || LINEAR || — || align=right | 6.8 km || 
|-id=703 bgcolor=#d6d6d6
| 31703 ||  || — || May 10, 1999 || Socorro || LINEAR || EOS || align=right | 9.3 km || 
|-id=704 bgcolor=#d6d6d6
| 31704 ||  || — || May 10, 1999 || Socorro || LINEAR || TIR || align=right | 4.7 km || 
|-id=705 bgcolor=#d6d6d6
| 31705 ||  || — || May 10, 1999 || Socorro || LINEAR || — || align=right | 11 km || 
|-id=706 bgcolor=#d6d6d6
| 31706 Singhani ||  ||  || May 10, 1999 || Socorro || LINEAR || — || align=right | 5.1 km || 
|-id=707 bgcolor=#d6d6d6
| 31707 ||  || — || May 10, 1999 || Socorro || LINEAR || HYG || align=right | 8.0 km || 
|-id=708 bgcolor=#E9E9E9
| 31708 ||  || — || May 10, 1999 || Socorro || LINEAR || — || align=right | 5.2 km || 
|-id=709 bgcolor=#d6d6d6
| 31709 ||  || — || May 10, 1999 || Socorro || LINEAR || — || align=right | 6.2 km || 
|-id=710 bgcolor=#d6d6d6
| 31710 ||  || — || May 10, 1999 || Socorro || LINEAR || — || align=right | 9.3 km || 
|-id=711 bgcolor=#E9E9E9
| 31711 Suresh ||  ||  || May 10, 1999 || Socorro || LINEAR || — || align=right | 3.6 km || 
|-id=712 bgcolor=#d6d6d6
| 31712 ||  || — || May 10, 1999 || Socorro || LINEAR || HYG || align=right | 8.4 km || 
|-id=713 bgcolor=#d6d6d6
| 31713 ||  || — || May 10, 1999 || Socorro || LINEAR || — || align=right | 8.2 km || 
|-id=714 bgcolor=#E9E9E9
| 31714 ||  || — || May 10, 1999 || Socorro || LINEAR || — || align=right | 3.7 km || 
|-id=715 bgcolor=#d6d6d6
| 31715 ||  || — || May 10, 1999 || Socorro || LINEAR || — || align=right | 5.3 km || 
|-id=716 bgcolor=#d6d6d6
| 31716 Matoonder ||  ||  || May 10, 1999 || Socorro || LINEAR || — || align=right | 5.9 km || 
|-id=717 bgcolor=#d6d6d6
| 31717 ||  || — || May 10, 1999 || Socorro || LINEAR || EOS || align=right | 9.3 km || 
|-id=718 bgcolor=#E9E9E9
| 31718 ||  || — || May 10, 1999 || Socorro || LINEAR || — || align=right | 7.6 km || 
|-id=719 bgcolor=#E9E9E9
| 31719 Davidyue ||  ||  || May 10, 1999 || Socorro || LINEAR || — || align=right | 5.7 km || 
|-id=720 bgcolor=#d6d6d6
| 31720 ||  || — || May 10, 1999 || Socorro || LINEAR || — || align=right | 6.4 km || 
|-id=721 bgcolor=#d6d6d6
| 31721 ||  || — || May 10, 1999 || Socorro || LINEAR || — || align=right | 8.9 km || 
|-id=722 bgcolor=#d6d6d6
| 31722 ||  || — || May 10, 1999 || Socorro || LINEAR || — || align=right | 8.2 km || 
|-id=723 bgcolor=#E9E9E9
| 31723 ||  || — || May 10, 1999 || Socorro || LINEAR || — || align=right | 11 km || 
|-id=724 bgcolor=#d6d6d6
| 31724 ||  || — || May 10, 1999 || Socorro || LINEAR || — || align=right | 9.1 km || 
|-id=725 bgcolor=#E9E9E9
| 31725 Anushazaman ||  ||  || May 12, 1999 || Socorro || LINEAR || — || align=right | 5.1 km || 
|-id=726 bgcolor=#d6d6d6
| 31726 ||  || — || May 12, 1999 || Socorro || LINEAR || HYG || align=right | 7.1 km || 
|-id=727 bgcolor=#E9E9E9
| 31727 Amandalewis ||  ||  || May 12, 1999 || Socorro || LINEAR || — || align=right | 2.7 km || 
|-id=728 bgcolor=#E9E9E9
| 31728 Rhondah ||  ||  || May 12, 1999 || Socorro || LINEAR || MRX || align=right | 2.9 km || 
|-id=729 bgcolor=#E9E9E9
| 31729 Scharmen ||  ||  || May 12, 1999 || Socorro || LINEAR || — || align=right | 8.3 km || 
|-id=730 bgcolor=#d6d6d6
| 31730 ||  || — || May 12, 1999 || Socorro || LINEAR || — || align=right | 9.6 km || 
|-id=731 bgcolor=#E9E9E9
| 31731 Johnwiley ||  ||  || May 12, 1999 || Socorro || LINEAR || — || align=right | 3.0 km || 
|-id=732 bgcolor=#E9E9E9
| 31732 ||  || — || May 12, 1999 || Socorro || LINEAR || — || align=right | 5.8 km || 
|-id=733 bgcolor=#d6d6d6
| 31733 ||  || — || May 12, 1999 || Socorro || LINEAR || — || align=right | 17 km || 
|-id=734 bgcolor=#d6d6d6
| 31734 ||  || — || May 12, 1999 || Socorro || LINEAR || EOS || align=right | 5.8 km || 
|-id=735 bgcolor=#d6d6d6
| 31735 ||  || — || May 12, 1999 || Socorro || LINEAR || — || align=right | 9.0 km || 
|-id=736 bgcolor=#d6d6d6
| 31736 ||  || — || May 12, 1999 || Socorro || LINEAR || EOS || align=right | 5.1 km || 
|-id=737 bgcolor=#fefefe
| 31737 Carriecoombs ||  ||  || May 10, 1999 || Socorro || LINEAR || V || align=right | 3.6 km || 
|-id=738 bgcolor=#d6d6d6
| 31738 ||  || — || May 12, 1999 || Socorro || LINEAR || URS || align=right | 8.9 km || 
|-id=739 bgcolor=#d6d6d6
| 31739 ||  || — || May 12, 1999 || Socorro || LINEAR || EOS || align=right | 4.4 km || 
|-id=740 bgcolor=#d6d6d6
| 31740 ||  || — || May 12, 1999 || Socorro || LINEAR || — || align=right | 5.6 km || 
|-id=741 bgcolor=#E9E9E9
| 31741 ||  || — || May 13, 1999 || Socorro || LINEAR || — || align=right | 5.2 km || 
|-id=742 bgcolor=#E9E9E9
| 31742 ||  || — || May 13, 1999 || Socorro || LINEAR || — || align=right | 5.8 km || 
|-id=743 bgcolor=#d6d6d6
| 31743 ||  || — || May 13, 1999 || Socorro || LINEAR || VER || align=right | 15 km || 
|-id=744 bgcolor=#E9E9E9
| 31744 Shimshock ||  ||  || May 13, 1999 || Socorro || LINEAR || GEF || align=right | 4.0 km || 
|-id=745 bgcolor=#d6d6d6
| 31745 ||  || — || May 12, 1999 || Socorro || LINEAR || EOS || align=right | 6.2 km || 
|-id=746 bgcolor=#d6d6d6
| 31746 ||  || — || May 12, 1999 || Socorro || LINEAR || EOS || align=right | 6.7 km || 
|-id=747 bgcolor=#d6d6d6
| 31747 ||  || — || May 12, 1999 || Socorro || LINEAR || — || align=right | 5.2 km || 
|-id=748 bgcolor=#d6d6d6
| 31748 ||  || — || May 12, 1999 || Socorro || LINEAR || — || align=right | 12 km || 
|-id=749 bgcolor=#d6d6d6
| 31749 ||  || — || May 12, 1999 || Socorro || LINEAR || MEL || align=right | 10 km || 
|-id=750 bgcolor=#E9E9E9
| 31750 ||  || — || May 12, 1999 || Socorro || LINEAR || — || align=right | 6.3 km || 
|-id=751 bgcolor=#d6d6d6
| 31751 ||  || — || May 14, 1999 || Socorro || LINEAR || — || align=right | 15 km || 
|-id=752 bgcolor=#E9E9E9
| 31752 ||  || — || May 12, 1999 || Socorro || LINEAR || EUN || align=right | 3.5 km || 
|-id=753 bgcolor=#d6d6d6
| 31753 ||  || — || May 12, 1999 || Socorro || LINEAR || URS || align=right | 11 km || 
|-id=754 bgcolor=#d6d6d6
| 31754 ||  || — || May 12, 1999 || Socorro || LINEAR || EOS || align=right | 5.5 km || 
|-id=755 bgcolor=#d6d6d6
| 31755 ||  || — || May 12, 1999 || Socorro || LINEAR || NAE || align=right | 9.1 km || 
|-id=756 bgcolor=#d6d6d6
| 31756 ||  || — || May 12, 1999 || Socorro || LINEAR || — || align=right | 15 km || 
|-id=757 bgcolor=#d6d6d6
| 31757 ||  || — || May 12, 1999 || Socorro || LINEAR || — || align=right | 8.7 km || 
|-id=758 bgcolor=#E9E9E9
| 31758 ||  || — || May 12, 1999 || Socorro || LINEAR || — || align=right | 8.4 km || 
|-id=759 bgcolor=#E9E9E9
| 31759 ||  || — || May 12, 1999 || Socorro || LINEAR || — || align=right | 5.9 km || 
|-id=760 bgcolor=#E9E9E9
| 31760 ||  || — || May 12, 1999 || Socorro || LINEAR || — || align=right | 4.2 km || 
|-id=761 bgcolor=#E9E9E9
| 31761 ||  || — || May 13, 1999 || Socorro || LINEAR || DOR || align=right | 10 km || 
|-id=762 bgcolor=#d6d6d6
| 31762 ||  || — || May 14, 1999 || Socorro || LINEAR || — || align=right | 16 km || 
|-id=763 bgcolor=#d6d6d6
| 31763 ||  || — || May 13, 1999 || Socorro || LINEAR || — || align=right | 8.4 km || 
|-id=764 bgcolor=#d6d6d6
| 31764 ||  || — || May 13, 1999 || Socorro || LINEAR || HYG || align=right | 6.9 km || 
|-id=765 bgcolor=#E9E9E9
| 31765 ||  || — || May 13, 1999 || Socorro || LINEAR || ADE || align=right | 7.1 km || 
|-id=766 bgcolor=#d6d6d6
| 31766 ||  || — || May 13, 1999 || Socorro || LINEAR || — || align=right | 7.6 km || 
|-id=767 bgcolor=#E9E9E9
| 31767 Jennimartin ||  ||  || May 13, 1999 || Socorro || LINEAR || — || align=right | 2.5 km || 
|-id=768 bgcolor=#E9E9E9
| 31768 ||  || — || May 13, 1999 || Socorro || LINEAR || — || align=right | 3.4 km || 
|-id=769 bgcolor=#d6d6d6
| 31769 ||  || — || May 13, 1999 || Socorro || LINEAR || EOS || align=right | 6.1 km || 
|-id=770 bgcolor=#d6d6d6
| 31770 Melivanhouten ||  ||  || May 13, 1999 || Socorro || LINEAR || KOR || align=right | 3.4 km || 
|-id=771 bgcolor=#d6d6d6
| 31771 Kirstenwright ||  ||  || May 13, 1999 || Socorro || LINEAR || — || align=right | 6.7 km || 
|-id=772 bgcolor=#d6d6d6
| 31772 Asztalos ||  ||  || May 13, 1999 || Socorro || LINEAR || — || align=right | 7.1 km || 
|-id=773 bgcolor=#d6d6d6
| 31773 ||  || — || May 13, 1999 || Socorro || LINEAR || — || align=right | 11 km || 
|-id=774 bgcolor=#d6d6d6
| 31774 Debralas ||  ||  || May 13, 1999 || Socorro || LINEAR || — || align=right | 5.4 km || 
|-id=775 bgcolor=#fefefe
| 31775 ||  || — || May 13, 1999 || Socorro || LINEAR || — || align=right | 4.6 km || 
|-id=776 bgcolor=#E9E9E9
| 31776 ||  || — || May 14, 1999 || Socorro || LINEAR || — || align=right | 5.7 km || 
|-id=777 bgcolor=#d6d6d6
| 31777 Amywinegar ||  ||  || May 10, 1999 || Socorro || LINEAR || KOR || align=right | 5.6 km || 
|-id=778 bgcolor=#fefefe
| 31778 Richardschnur ||  ||  || May 12, 1999 || Socorro || LINEAR || V || align=right | 3.0 km || 
|-id=779 bgcolor=#E9E9E9
| 31779 ||  || — || May 12, 1999 || Socorro || LINEAR || — || align=right | 9.0 km || 
|-id=780 bgcolor=#d6d6d6
| 31780 ||  || — || May 15, 1999 || Anderson Mesa || LONEOS || EOS || align=right | 6.9 km || 
|-id=781 bgcolor=#E9E9E9
| 31781 ||  || — || May 17, 1999 || Kitt Peak || Spacewatch || HEN || align=right | 3.1 km || 
|-id=782 bgcolor=#E9E9E9
| 31782 ||  || — || May 21, 1999 || Majorca || Á. López J., R. Pacheco || — || align=right | 7.6 km || 
|-id=783 bgcolor=#d6d6d6
| 31783 ||  || — || May 18, 1999 || Socorro || LINEAR || EOS || align=right | 6.2 km || 
|-id=784 bgcolor=#fefefe
| 31784 ||  || — || May 18, 1999 || Socorro || LINEAR || — || align=right | 5.9 km || 
|-id=785 bgcolor=#E9E9E9
| 31785 ||  || — || May 18, 1999 || Socorro || LINEAR || — || align=right | 7.7 km || 
|-id=786 bgcolor=#E9E9E9
| 31786 ||  || — || May 18, 1999 || Socorro || LINEAR || — || align=right | 8.6 km || 
|-id=787 bgcolor=#E9E9E9
| 31787 Darcylawson ||  ||  || May 18, 1999 || Socorro || LINEAR || — || align=right | 7.4 km || 
|-id=788 bgcolor=#d6d6d6
| 31788 ||  || — || May 18, 1999 || Socorro || LINEAR || URS || align=right | 14 km || 
|-id=789 bgcolor=#d6d6d6
| 31789 ||  || — || May 18, 1999 || Socorro || LINEAR || — || align=right | 6.2 km || 
|-id=790 bgcolor=#E9E9E9
| 31790 ||  || — || June 7, 1999 || Socorro || LINEAR || EUN || align=right | 7.8 km || 
|-id=791 bgcolor=#d6d6d6
| 31791 ||  || — || June 7, 1999 || Socorro || LINEAR || EUP || align=right | 11 km || 
|-id=792 bgcolor=#d6d6d6
| 31792 ||  || — || June 8, 1999 || Socorro || LINEAR || TIR || align=right | 4.1 km || 
|-id=793 bgcolor=#fefefe
| 31793 ||  || — || June 11, 1999 || Socorro || LINEAR || H || align=right | 3.2 km || 
|-id=794 bgcolor=#E9E9E9
| 31794 ||  || — || June 8, 1999 || Socorro || LINEAR || — || align=right | 10 km || 
|-id=795 bgcolor=#fefefe
| 31795 ||  || — || June 9, 1999 || Socorro || LINEAR || V || align=right | 3.2 km || 
|-id=796 bgcolor=#d6d6d6
| 31796 ||  || — || June 12, 1999 || Socorro || LINEAR || ALA || align=right | 11 km || 
|-id=797 bgcolor=#E9E9E9
| 31797 ||  || — || June 9, 1999 || Socorro || LINEAR || GEF || align=right | 4.8 km || 
|-id=798 bgcolor=#E9E9E9
| 31798 ||  || — || June 9, 1999 || Socorro || LINEAR || — || align=right | 8.8 km || 
|-id=799 bgcolor=#E9E9E9
| 31799 ||  || — || June 9, 1999 || Socorro || LINEAR || EUN || align=right | 5.4 km || 
|-id=800 bgcolor=#d6d6d6
| 31800 ||  || — || June 9, 1999 || Socorro || LINEAR || — || align=right | 8.1 km || 
|}

31801–31900 

|-bgcolor=#d6d6d6
| 31801 ||  || — || June 9, 1999 || Socorro || LINEAR || — || align=right | 18 km || 
|-id=802 bgcolor=#E9E9E9
| 31802 ||  || — || June 12, 1999 || Kitt Peak || Spacewatch || — || align=right | 7.9 km || 
|-id=803 bgcolor=#E9E9E9
| 31803 ||  || — || June 6, 1999 || Catalina || CSS || — || align=right | 4.7 km || 
|-id=804 bgcolor=#E9E9E9
| 31804 || 1999 MG || — || June 18, 1999 || Reedy Creek || J. Broughton || EUN || align=right | 4.6 km || 
|-id=805 bgcolor=#d6d6d6
| 31805 ||  || — || July 13, 1999 || Socorro || LINEAR || ALA || align=right | 14 km || 
|-id=806 bgcolor=#C2FFFF
| 31806 ||  || — || July 13, 1999 || Socorro || LINEAR || L5 || align=right | 24 km || 
|-id=807 bgcolor=#E9E9E9
| 31807 Shaunalennon ||  ||  || July 14, 1999 || Socorro || LINEAR || — || align=right | 3.4 km || 
|-id=808 bgcolor=#E9E9E9
| 31808 ||  || — || July 14, 1999 || Socorro || LINEAR || — || align=right | 11 km || 
|-id=809 bgcolor=#d6d6d6
| 31809 ||  || — || July 14, 1999 || Socorro || LINEAR || URS || align=right | 15 km || 
|-id=810 bgcolor=#d6d6d6
| 31810 ||  || — || July 14, 1999 || Socorro || LINEAR || — || align=right | 14 km || 
|-id=811 bgcolor=#d6d6d6
| 31811 ||  || — || July 14, 1999 || Socorro || LINEAR || EOS || align=right | 14 km || 
|-id=812 bgcolor=#E9E9E9
| 31812 ||  || — || July 13, 1999 || Socorro || LINEAR || — || align=right | 10 km || 
|-id=813 bgcolor=#fefefe
| 31813 ||  || — || September 13, 1999 || Socorro || LINEAR || H || align=right | 2.2 km || 
|-id=814 bgcolor=#C2FFFF
| 31814 ||  || — || September 7, 1999 || Socorro || LINEAR || L5 || align=right | 18 km || 
|-id=815 bgcolor=#E9E9E9
| 31815 ||  || — || September 9, 1999 || Socorro || LINEAR || — || align=right | 6.0 km || 
|-id=816 bgcolor=#d6d6d6
| 31816 ||  || — || September 9, 1999 || Socorro || LINEAR || EOS || align=right | 8.0 km || 
|-id=817 bgcolor=#d6d6d6
| 31817 ||  || — || September 9, 1999 || Socorro || LINEAR || 3:2 || align=right | 22 km || 
|-id=818 bgcolor=#d6d6d6
| 31818 ||  || — || September 9, 1999 || Socorro || LINEAR || ALA || align=right | 20 km || 
|-id=819 bgcolor=#C2FFFF
| 31819 ||  || — || September 9, 1999 || Socorro || LINEAR || L5 || align=right | 30 km || 
|-id=820 bgcolor=#C2FFFF
| 31820 ||  || — || September 9, 1999 || Socorro || LINEAR || L5 || align=right | 17 km || 
|-id=821 bgcolor=#C2FFFF
| 31821 ||  || — || September 3, 1999 || Kitt Peak || Spacewatch || L5 || align=right | 20 km || 
|-id=822 bgcolor=#d6d6d6
| 31822 ||  || — || September 29, 1999 || Socorro || LINEAR || 7:4 || align=right | 22 km || 
|-id=823 bgcolor=#E9E9E9
| 31823 Viète ||  ||  || October 4, 1999 || Prescott || P. G. Comba || — || align=right | 6.0 km || 
|-id=824 bgcolor=#C7FF8F
| 31824 Elatus ||  ||  || October 29, 1999 || Catalina || CSS || centaur || align=right | 57 km || 
|-id=825 bgcolor=#fefefe
| 31825 ||  || — || October 29, 1999 || Catalina || CSS || NYS || align=right | 2.0 km || 
|-id=826 bgcolor=#E9E9E9
| 31826 ||  || — || November 5, 1999 || Oizumi || T. Kobayashi || — || align=right | 13 km || 
|-id=827 bgcolor=#fefefe
| 31827 ||  || — || November 1, 1999 || Socorro || LINEAR || H || align=right | 2.7 km || 
|-id=828 bgcolor=#d6d6d6
| 31828 ||  || — || November 4, 1999 || Anderson Mesa || LONEOS || — || align=right | 15 km || 
|-id=829 bgcolor=#d6d6d6
| 31829 ||  || — || December 5, 1999 || Socorro || LINEAR || EOS || align=right | 8.0 km || 
|-id=830 bgcolor=#d6d6d6
| 31830 ||  || — || December 7, 1999 || Socorro || LINEAR || — || align=right | 12 km || 
|-id=831 bgcolor=#fefefe
| 31831 || 1999 YL || — || December 16, 1999 || Socorro || LINEAR || H || align=right | 2.2 km || 
|-id=832 bgcolor=#FA8072
| 31832 ||  || — || January 4, 2000 || Socorro || LINEAR || — || align=right | 2.5 km || 
|-id=833 bgcolor=#E9E9E9
| 31833 ||  || — || January 5, 2000 || Socorro || LINEAR || EUN || align=right | 4.1 km || 
|-id=834 bgcolor=#E9E9E9
| 31834 ||  || — || January 5, 2000 || Socorro || LINEAR || — || align=right | 3.7 km || 
|-id=835 bgcolor=#C2FFFF
| 31835 ||  || — || January 30, 2000 || Socorro || LINEAR || L4 || align=right | 27 km || 
|-id=836 bgcolor=#fefefe
| 31836 Poshedly ||  ||  || January 30, 2000 || Catalina || CSS || — || align=right | 2.7 km || 
|-id=837 bgcolor=#E9E9E9
| 31837 ||  || — || February 2, 2000 || Socorro || LINEAR || EUN || align=right | 4.1 km || 
|-id=838 bgcolor=#fefefe
| 31838 Angelarob ||  ||  || February 2, 2000 || Socorro || LINEAR || V || align=right | 3.5 km || 
|-id=839 bgcolor=#fefefe
| 31839 Depinto ||  ||  || February 2, 2000 || Socorro || LINEAR || NYS || align=right | 1.7 km || 
|-id=840 bgcolor=#fefefe
| 31840 Normnegus ||  ||  || February 2, 2000 || Socorro || LINEAR || FLO || align=right | 1.8 km || 
|-id=841 bgcolor=#fefefe
| 31841 ||  || — || February 7, 2000 || Socorro || LINEAR || V || align=right | 3.6 km || 
|-id=842 bgcolor=#fefefe
| 31842 ||  || — || February 10, 2000 || Višnjan Observatory || K. Korlević || NYS || align=right | 2.3 km || 
|-id=843 bgcolor=#FA8072
| 31843 ||  || — || February 8, 2000 || Socorro || LINEAR || — || align=right | 2.8 km || 
|-id=844 bgcolor=#fefefe
| 31844 Mattwill ||  ||  || February 26, 2000 || Catalina || CSS || FLO || align=right | 2.2 km || 
|-id=845 bgcolor=#FA8072
| 31845 ||  || — || February 29, 2000 || Socorro || LINEAR || — || align=right | 1.6 km || 
|-id=846 bgcolor=#fefefe
| 31846 Elainegillum ||  ||  || February 29, 2000 || Socorro || LINEAR || NYS || align=right | 1.4 km || 
|-id=847 bgcolor=#d6d6d6
| 31847 ||  || — || February 29, 2000 || Socorro || LINEAR || — || align=right | 9.3 km || 
|-id=848 bgcolor=#fefefe
| 31848 Mikemattei ||  ||  || March 3, 2000 || Catalina || CSS || — || align=right | 6.7 km || 
|-id=849 bgcolor=#fefefe
| 31849 ||  || — || March 5, 2000 || Socorro || LINEAR || H || align=right | 1.4 km || 
|-id=850 bgcolor=#fefefe
| 31850 ||  || — || March 5, 2000 || Socorro || LINEAR || H || align=right | 1.4 km || 
|-id=851 bgcolor=#fefefe
| 31851 ||  || — || March 8, 2000 || Socorro || LINEAR || — || align=right | 1.7 km || 
|-id=852 bgcolor=#E9E9E9
| 31852 ||  || — || March 8, 2000 || Socorro || LINEAR || — || align=right | 3.3 km || 
|-id=853 bgcolor=#fefefe
| 31853 Rahulmital ||  ||  || March 9, 2000 || Socorro || LINEAR || V || align=right | 1.9 km || 
|-id=854 bgcolor=#fefefe
| 31854 Darshanashah ||  ||  || March 9, 2000 || Socorro || LINEAR || — || align=right | 1.3 km || 
|-id=855 bgcolor=#E9E9E9
| 31855 ||  || — || March 6, 2000 || Višnjan Observatory || K. Korlević || — || align=right | 3.7 km || 
|-id=856 bgcolor=#E9E9E9
| 31856 ||  || — || March 10, 2000 || Kitt Peak || Spacewatch || — || align=right | 3.5 km || 
|-id=857 bgcolor=#fefefe
| 31857 ||  || — || March 8, 2000 || Socorro || LINEAR || — || align=right | 1.7 km || 
|-id=858 bgcolor=#fefefe
| 31858 Raykanipe ||  ||  || March 9, 2000 || Socorro || LINEAR || V || align=right | 1.6 km || 
|-id=859 bgcolor=#fefefe
| 31859 Zemaitis ||  ||  || March 10, 2000 || Socorro || LINEAR || MAS || align=right | 1.8 km || 
|-id=860 bgcolor=#fefefe
| 31860 ||  || — || March 10, 2000 || Socorro || LINEAR || — || align=right | 1.7 km || 
|-id=861 bgcolor=#fefefe
| 31861 Darleshimizu ||  ||  || March 10, 2000 || Socorro || LINEAR || MAS || align=right | 1.5 km || 
|-id=862 bgcolor=#fefefe
| 31862 Garfinkle ||  ||  || March 11, 2000 || Catalina || CSS || — || align=right | 2.3 km || 
|-id=863 bgcolor=#fefefe
| 31863 Hazelcoffman ||  ||  || March 5, 2000 || Socorro || LINEAR || — || align=right | 4.6 km || 
|-id=864 bgcolor=#d6d6d6
| 31864 ||  || — || March 8, 2000 || Socorro || LINEAR || — || align=right | 13 km || 
|-id=865 bgcolor=#E9E9E9
| 31865 ||  || — || March 8, 2000 || Socorro || LINEAR || — || align=right | 4.8 km || 
|-id=866 bgcolor=#fefefe
| 31866 ||  || — || March 9, 2000 || Socorro || LINEAR || — || align=right | 2.0 km || 
|-id=867 bgcolor=#E9E9E9
| 31867 ||  || — || March 9, 2000 || Socorro || LINEAR || — || align=right | 4.3 km || 
|-id=868 bgcolor=#fefefe
| 31868 ||  || — || March 10, 2000 || Socorro || LINEAR || — || align=right | 2.0 km || 
|-id=869 bgcolor=#FA8072
| 31869 ||  || — || March 8, 2000 || Kitt Peak || Spacewatch || — || align=right | 3.0 km || 
|-id=870 bgcolor=#E9E9E9
| 31870 ||  || — || March 8, 2000 || Kitt Peak || Spacewatch || — || align=right | 4.4 km || 
|-id=871 bgcolor=#E9E9E9
| 31871 ||  || — || March 11, 2000 || Anderson Mesa || LONEOS || — || align=right | 4.3 km || 
|-id=872 bgcolor=#fefefe
| 31872 Terkán ||  ||  || March 13, 2000 || Piszkéstető || K. Sárneczky, G. Szabó || — || align=right | 3.8 km || 
|-id=873 bgcolor=#fefefe
| 31873 Toliou ||  ||  || March 11, 2000 || Anderson Mesa || LONEOS || NYS || align=right | 4.3 km || 
|-id=874 bgcolor=#fefefe
| 31874 ||  || — || March 11, 2000 || Anderson Mesa || LONEOS || — || align=right | 2.9 km || 
|-id=875 bgcolor=#fefefe
| 31875 Saksena ||  ||  || March 11, 2000 || Socorro || LINEAR || — || align=right | 1.3 km || 
|-id=876 bgcolor=#E9E9E9
| 31876 Jenkens ||  ||  || March 2, 2000 || Catalina || CSS || — || align=right | 3.8 km || 
|-id=877 bgcolor=#fefefe
| 31877 Davideverett ||  ||  || March 3, 2000 || Catalina || CSS || — || align=right | 5.3 km || 
|-id=878 bgcolor=#fefefe
| 31878 ||  || — || March 29, 2000 || Kvistaberg || UDAS || — || align=right | 4.5 km || 
|-id=879 bgcolor=#d6d6d6
| 31879 ||  || — || March 28, 2000 || Socorro || LINEAR || — || align=right | 7.0 km || 
|-id=880 bgcolor=#fefefe
| 31880 ||  || — || March 29, 2000 || Socorro || LINEAR || — || align=right | 4.1 km || 
|-id=881 bgcolor=#FA8072
| 31881 ||  || — || March 30, 2000 || Socorro || LINEAR || — || align=right | 1.5 km || 
|-id=882 bgcolor=#fefefe
| 31882 ||  || — || March 29, 2000 || Socorro || LINEAR || — || align=right | 2.5 km || 
|-id=883 bgcolor=#fefefe
| 31883 Susanstern ||  ||  || March 29, 2000 || Socorro || LINEAR || — || align=right | 2.5 km || 
|-id=884 bgcolor=#E9E9E9
| 31884 ||  || — || March 27, 2000 || Anderson Mesa || LONEOS || — || align=right | 3.5 km || 
|-id=885 bgcolor=#fefefe
| 31885 Greggweger ||  ||  || March 29, 2000 || Socorro || LINEAR || MAS || align=right | 1.9 km || 
|-id=886 bgcolor=#fefefe
| 31886 Verlisak ||  ||  || March 29, 2000 || Socorro || LINEAR || NYS || align=right | 1.7 km || 
|-id=887 bgcolor=#E9E9E9
| 31887 ||  || — || March 29, 2000 || Socorro || LINEAR || — || align=right | 6.1 km || 
|-id=888 bgcolor=#fefefe
| 31888 Polizzi ||  ||  || March 29, 2000 || Socorro || LINEAR || V || align=right | 2.2 km || 
|-id=889 bgcolor=#fefefe
| 31889 ||  || — || March 29, 2000 || Socorro || LINEAR || — || align=right | 10 km || 
|-id=890 bgcolor=#fefefe
| 31890 ||  || — || March 29, 2000 || Socorro || LINEAR || NYS || align=right | 2.2 km || 
|-id=891 bgcolor=#E9E9E9
| 31891 ||  || — || March 28, 2000 || Socorro || LINEAR || — || align=right | 4.5 km || 
|-id=892 bgcolor=#fefefe
| 31892 ||  || — || March 28, 2000 || Socorro || LINEAR || — || align=right | 1.9 km || 
|-id=893 bgcolor=#fefefe
| 31893 Rodriguezalvarez ||  ||  || March 29, 2000 || Socorro || LINEAR || — || align=right | 2.0 km || 
|-id=894 bgcolor=#fefefe
| 31894 ||  || — || March 29, 2000 || Socorro || LINEAR || ERI || align=right | 6.4 km || 
|-id=895 bgcolor=#FA8072
| 31895 ||  || — || March 29, 2000 || Socorro || LINEAR || — || align=right | 2.7 km || 
|-id=896 bgcolor=#fefefe
| 31896 Gaydarov ||  ||  || March 30, 2000 || Socorro || LINEAR || V || align=right | 2.0 km || 
|-id=897 bgcolor=#fefefe
| 31897 Brooksdasilva ||  ||  || March 30, 2000 || Socorro || LINEAR || V || align=right | 3.0 km || 
|-id=898 bgcolor=#fefefe
| 31898 ||  || — || April 2, 2000 || Socorro || LINEAR || H || align=right | 1.7 km || 
|-id=899 bgcolor=#fefefe
| 31899 Adityamohan ||  ||  || April 4, 2000 || Socorro || LINEAR || — || align=right | 1.6 km || 
|-id=900 bgcolor=#fefefe
| 31900 ||  || — || April 5, 2000 || Socorro || LINEAR || NYS || align=right | 2.1 km || 
|}

31901–32000 

|-bgcolor=#fefefe
| 31901 Amitscheer ||  ||  || April 12, 2000 || Socorro || LINEAR || — || align=right | 2.9 km || 
|-id=902 bgcolor=#fefefe
| 31902 Raymondwang ||  ||  || April 5, 2000 || Socorro || LINEAR || — || align=right | 2.2 km || 
|-id=903 bgcolor=#E9E9E9
| 31903 Euniceyou ||  ||  || April 5, 2000 || Socorro || LINEAR || — || align=right | 4.4 km || 
|-id=904 bgcolor=#fefefe
| 31904 Haoruochen ||  ||  || April 5, 2000 || Socorro || LINEAR || V || align=right | 1.9 km || 
|-id=905 bgcolor=#fefefe
| 31905 Likinpong ||  ||  || April 5, 2000 || Socorro || LINEAR || V || align=right | 1.8 km || 
|-id=906 bgcolor=#fefefe
| 31906 ||  || — || April 5, 2000 || Socorro || LINEAR || — || align=right | 1.7 km || 
|-id=907 bgcolor=#fefefe
| 31907 Wongsumming ||  ||  || April 5, 2000 || Socorro || LINEAR || — || align=right | 4.3 km || 
|-id=908 bgcolor=#fefefe
| 31908 ||  || — || April 5, 2000 || Socorro || LINEAR || FLO || align=right | 3.3 km || 
|-id=909 bgcolor=#fefefe
| 31909 Chenweitung ||  ||  || April 5, 2000 || Socorro || LINEAR || NYS || align=right | 1.7 km || 
|-id=910 bgcolor=#fefefe
| 31910 Moustafa ||  ||  || April 5, 2000 || Socorro || LINEAR || — || align=right | 2.0 km || 
|-id=911 bgcolor=#fefefe
| 31911 Luciafauth ||  ||  || April 5, 2000 || Socorro || LINEAR || NYS || align=right | 1.4 km || 
|-id=912 bgcolor=#E9E9E9
| 31912 Lukasgrafner ||  ||  || April 5, 2000 || Socorro || LINEAR || — || align=right | 2.1 km || 
|-id=913 bgcolor=#FA8072
| 31913 ||  || — || April 5, 2000 || Socorro || LINEAR || — || align=right | 3.8 km || 
|-id=914 bgcolor=#fefefe
| 31914 ||  || — || April 5, 2000 || Socorro || LINEAR || — || align=right | 1.9 km || 
|-id=915 bgcolor=#E9E9E9
| 31915 ||  || — || April 5, 2000 || Socorro || LINEAR || — || align=right | 5.9 km || 
|-id=916 bgcolor=#fefefe
| 31916 Arnehensel ||  ||  || April 5, 2000 || Socorro || LINEAR || — || align=right | 1.5 km || 
|-id=917 bgcolor=#fefefe
| 31917 Lukashohne ||  ||  || April 5, 2000 || Socorro || LINEAR || MAS || align=right | 3.1 km || 
|-id=918 bgcolor=#fefefe
| 31918 Onkargujral ||  ||  || April 5, 2000 || Socorro || LINEAR || — || align=right | 4.2 km || 
|-id=919 bgcolor=#fefefe
| 31919 Carragher ||  ||  || April 5, 2000 || Socorro || LINEAR || — || align=right | 2.3 km || 
|-id=920 bgcolor=#fefefe
| 31920 Annamcevoy ||  ||  || April 5, 2000 || Socorro || LINEAR || V || align=right | 1.6 km || 
|-id=921 bgcolor=#fefefe
| 31921 ||  || — || April 5, 2000 || Socorro || LINEAR || — || align=right | 3.8 km || 
|-id=922 bgcolor=#fefefe
| 31922 Alsharif ||  ||  || April 5, 2000 || Socorro || LINEAR || — || align=right | 2.6 km || 
|-id=923 bgcolor=#d6d6d6
| 31923 ||  || — || April 5, 2000 || Socorro || LINEAR || 628 || align=right | 5.0 km || 
|-id=924 bgcolor=#fefefe
| 31924 ||  || — || April 5, 2000 || Socorro || LINEAR || NYS || align=right | 2.0 km || 
|-id=925 bgcolor=#fefefe
| 31925 Krutovskiy ||  ||  || April 5, 2000 || Socorro || LINEAR || — || align=right | 2.2 km || 
|-id=926 bgcolor=#E9E9E9
| 31926 Alhamood ||  ||  || April 5, 2000 || Socorro || LINEAR || MRX || align=right | 4.0 km || 
|-id=927 bgcolor=#fefefe
| 31927 ||  || — || April 5, 2000 || Socorro || LINEAR || — || align=right | 1.4 km || 
|-id=928 bgcolor=#fefefe
| 31928 Limzhengtheng ||  ||  || April 5, 2000 || Socorro || LINEAR || — || align=right | 2.2 km || 
|-id=929 bgcolor=#fefefe
| 31929 ||  || — || April 5, 2000 || Socorro || LINEAR || — || align=right | 2.3 km || 
|-id=930 bgcolor=#E9E9E9
| 31930 ||  || — || April 6, 2000 || Socorro || LINEAR || EUN || align=right | 2.6 km || 
|-id=931 bgcolor=#E9E9E9
| 31931 Sipiera ||  ||  || April 10, 2000 || Prescott || P. G. Comba || — || align=right | 4.1 km || 
|-id=932 bgcolor=#d6d6d6
| 31932 ||  || — || April 3, 2000 || Socorro || LINEAR || ALA || align=right | 14 km || 
|-id=933 bgcolor=#fefefe
| 31933 Tanyizhao ||  ||  || April 4, 2000 || Socorro || LINEAR || FLO || align=right | 1.9 km || 
|-id=934 bgcolor=#fefefe
| 31934 Benjamintan ||  ||  || April 4, 2000 || Socorro || LINEAR || NYS || align=right | 2.3 km || 
|-id=935 bgcolor=#fefefe
| 31935 Midgley ||  ||  || April 4, 2000 || Socorro || LINEAR || FLO || align=right | 2.0 km || 
|-id=936 bgcolor=#E9E9E9
| 31936 Bernardsmit ||  ||  || April 6, 2000 || Socorro || LINEAR || — || align=right | 4.1 km || 
|-id=937 bgcolor=#fefefe
| 31937 Kangsunwoo ||  ||  || April 7, 2000 || Socorro || LINEAR || FLO || align=right | 2.5 km || 
|-id=938 bgcolor=#fefefe
| 31938 Nattapong ||  ||  || April 7, 2000 || Socorro || LINEAR || FLO || align=right | 2.3 km || 
|-id=939 bgcolor=#fefefe
| 31939 Thananon ||  ||  || April 7, 2000 || Socorro || LINEAR || — || align=right | 3.2 km || 
|-id=940 bgcolor=#fefefe
| 31940 Sutthiluk ||  ||  || April 7, 2000 || Socorro || LINEAR || FLO || align=right | 1.6 km || 
|-id=941 bgcolor=#fefefe
| 31941 ||  || — || April 13, 2000 || Socorro || LINEAR || — || align=right | 4.2 km || 
|-id=942 bgcolor=#fefefe
| 31942 ||  || — || April 7, 2000 || Socorro || LINEAR || — || align=right | 3.3 km || 
|-id=943 bgcolor=#fefefe
| 31943 Tahsinelmas ||  ||  || April 7, 2000 || Socorro || LINEAR || FLO || align=right | 2.1 km || 
|-id=944 bgcolor=#fefefe
| 31944 Seyitherdem ||  ||  || April 7, 2000 || Socorro || LINEAR || FLO || align=right | 1.7 km || 
|-id=945 bgcolor=#fefefe
| 31945 ||  || — || April 7, 2000 || Socorro || LINEAR || — || align=right | 3.3 km || 
|-id=946 bgcolor=#fefefe
| 31946 Sahilabbi ||  ||  || April 7, 2000 || Socorro || LINEAR || — || align=right | 2.1 km || 
|-id=947 bgcolor=#E9E9E9
| 31947 ||  || — || April 7, 2000 || Socorro || LINEAR || — || align=right | 3.8 km || 
|-id=948 bgcolor=#fefefe
| 31948 ||  || — || April 2, 2000 || Anderson Mesa || LONEOS || — || align=right | 1.9 km || 
|-id=949 bgcolor=#E9E9E9
| 31949 ||  || — || April 5, 2000 || Kitt Peak || Spacewatch || — || align=right | 2.3 km || 
|-id=950 bgcolor=#E9E9E9
| 31950 ||  || — || April 6, 2000 || Kitt Peak || Spacewatch || — || align=right | 2.9 km || 
|-id=951 bgcolor=#fefefe
| 31951 Alexisallen ||  ||  || April 7, 2000 || Socorro || LINEAR || — || align=right | 2.5 km || 
|-id=952 bgcolor=#fefefe
| 31952 Bialtdecelie ||  ||  || April 7, 2000 || Socorro || LINEAR || — || align=right | 2.3 km || 
|-id=953 bgcolor=#fefefe
| 31953 Bontha ||  ||  || April 7, 2000 || Socorro || LINEAR || — || align=right | 2.1 km || 
|-id=954 bgcolor=#fefefe
| 31954 Georgiebotev ||  ||  || April 7, 2000 || Socorro || LINEAR || V || align=right | 2.7 km || 
|-id=955 bgcolor=#fefefe
| 31955 ||  || — || April 7, 2000 || Socorro || LINEAR || — || align=right | 4.2 km || 
|-id=956 bgcolor=#E9E9E9
| 31956 Wald ||  ||  || April 13, 2000 || Prescott || P. G. Comba || — || align=right | 3.4 km || 
|-id=957 bgcolor=#fefefe
| 31957 Braunstein ||  ||  || April 7, 2000 || Socorro || LINEAR || FLO || align=right | 1.7 km || 
|-id=958 bgcolor=#E9E9E9
| 31958 ||  || — || April 8, 2000 || Socorro || LINEAR || — || align=right | 3.1 km || 
|-id=959 bgcolor=#E9E9E9
| 31959 Keianacave ||  ||  || April 12, 2000 || Socorro || LINEAR || — || align=right | 4.2 km || 
|-id=960 bgcolor=#fefefe
| 31960 ||  || — || April 7, 2000 || Anderson Mesa || LONEOS || — || align=right | 2.7 km || 
|-id=961 bgcolor=#fefefe
| 31961 ||  || — || April 7, 2000 || Anderson Mesa || LONEOS || — || align=right | 2.9 km || 
|-id=962 bgcolor=#E9E9E9
| 31962 ||  || — || April 6, 2000 || Anderson Mesa || LONEOS || RAF || align=right | 2.8 km || 
|-id=963 bgcolor=#fefefe
| 31963 ||  || — || April 6, 2000 || Anderson Mesa || LONEOS || V || align=right | 1.7 km || 
|-id=964 bgcolor=#fefefe
| 31964 ||  || — || April 7, 2000 || Socorro || LINEAR || NYS || align=right | 2.1 km || 
|-id=965 bgcolor=#fefefe
| 31965 ||  || — || April 7, 2000 || Socorro || LINEAR || — || align=right | 3.0 km || 
|-id=966 bgcolor=#fefefe
| 31966 ||  || — || April 25, 2000 || Kitt Peak || Spacewatch || V || align=right | 1.4 km || 
|-id=967 bgcolor=#d6d6d6
| 31967 ||  || — || April 27, 2000 || Socorro || LINEAR || — || align=right | 11 km || 
|-id=968 bgcolor=#fefefe
| 31968 ||  || — || April 28, 2000 || Socorro || LINEAR || H || align=right | 1.3 km || 
|-id=969 bgcolor=#E9E9E9
| 31969 Yihuachen ||  ||  || April 27, 2000 || Socorro || LINEAR || — || align=right | 2.3 km || 
|-id=970 bgcolor=#E9E9E9
| 31970 ||  || — || April 27, 2000 || Socorro || LINEAR || — || align=right | 3.2 km || 
|-id=971 bgcolor=#fefefe
| 31971 Beatricechoi ||  ||  || April 27, 2000 || Socorro || LINEAR || NYS || align=right | 2.5 km || 
|-id=972 bgcolor=#fefefe
| 31972 Carlycrump ||  ||  || April 27, 2000 || Socorro || LINEAR || V || align=right | 1.4 km || 
|-id=973 bgcolor=#fefefe
| 31973 Ashwindatta ||  ||  || April 27, 2000 || Socorro || LINEAR || V || align=right | 2.2 km || 
|-id=974 bgcolor=#fefefe
| 31974 ||  || — || April 28, 2000 || Socorro || LINEAR || FLO || align=right | 1.5 km || 
|-id=975 bgcolor=#fefefe
| 31975 Johndean ||  ||  || April 28, 2000 || Socorro || LINEAR || FLO || align=right | 3.0 km || 
|-id=976 bgcolor=#E9E9E9
| 31976 Niyatidesai ||  ||  || April 28, 2000 || Socorro || LINEAR || — || align=right | 4.9 km || 
|-id=977 bgcolor=#fefefe
| 31977 Devalapurkar ||  ||  || April 28, 2000 || Socorro || LINEAR || — || align=right | 2.3 km || 
|-id=978 bgcolor=#fefefe
| 31978 Jeremyphilip ||  ||  || April 28, 2000 || Socorro || LINEAR || NYS || align=right | 2.1 km || 
|-id=979 bgcolor=#E9E9E9
| 31979 ||  || — || April 28, 2000 || Socorro || LINEAR || — || align=right | 12 km || 
|-id=980 bgcolor=#E9E9E9
| 31980 Axelfeldmann ||  ||  || April 28, 2000 || Socorro || LINEAR || — || align=right | 3.1 km || 
|-id=981 bgcolor=#fefefe
| 31981 ||  || — || April 27, 2000 || Socorro || LINEAR || NYS || align=right | 2.5 km || 
|-id=982 bgcolor=#d6d6d6
| 31982 Johnwallis ||  ||  || April 30, 2000 || Prescott || P. G. Comba || — || align=right | 4.8 km || 
|-id=983 bgcolor=#E9E9E9
| 31983 ||  || — || April 28, 2000 || Socorro || LINEAR || — || align=right | 3.1 km || 
|-id=984 bgcolor=#fefefe
| 31984 Unger ||  ||  || April 25, 2000 || Starkenburg Observatory || Starkenburg Obs. || NYS || align=right | 2.0 km || 
|-id=985 bgcolor=#fefefe
| 31985 Andrewryan ||  ||  || April 24, 2000 || Anderson Mesa || LONEOS || NYS || align=right | 3.2 km || 
|-id=986 bgcolor=#fefefe
| 31986 ||  || — || April 28, 2000 || Socorro || LINEAR || H || align=right | 1.2 km || 
|-id=987 bgcolor=#fefefe
| 31987 ||  || — || April 29, 2000 || Socorro || LINEAR || NYS || align=right | 1.8 km || 
|-id=988 bgcolor=#fefefe
| 31988 Jasonfiacco ||  ||  || April 28, 2000 || Socorro || LINEAR || — || align=right | 1.9 km || 
|-id=989 bgcolor=#fefefe
| 31989 ||  || — || April 24, 2000 || Anderson Mesa || LONEOS || — || align=right | 1.4 km || 
|-id=990 bgcolor=#fefefe
| 31990 ||  || — || April 26, 2000 || Višnjan Observatory || K. Korlević || — || align=right | 3.1 km || 
|-id=991 bgcolor=#fefefe
| 31991 Royghosh ||  ||  || April 27, 2000 || Socorro || LINEAR || — || align=right | 2.0 km || 
|-id=992 bgcolor=#fefefe
| 31992 ||  || — || April 28, 2000 || Socorro || LINEAR || — || align=right | 2.6 km || 
|-id=993 bgcolor=#E9E9E9
| 31993 ||  || — || April 28, 2000 || Socorro || LINEAR || — || align=right | 5.0 km || 
|-id=994 bgcolor=#fefefe
| 31994 ||  || — || April 28, 2000 || Socorro || LINEAR || — || align=right | 2.6 km || 
|-id=995 bgcolor=#fefefe
| 31995 ||  || — || April 29, 2000 || Socorro || LINEAR || — || align=right | 2.5 km || 
|-id=996 bgcolor=#fefefe
| 31996 Goecknerwald ||  ||  || April 29, 2000 || Socorro || LINEAR || V || align=right | 1.3 km || 
|-id=997 bgcolor=#E9E9E9
| 31997 ||  || — || April 29, 2000 || Kitt Peak || Spacewatch || — || align=right | 2.6 km || 
|-id=998 bgcolor=#fefefe
| 31998 ||  || — || April 26, 2000 || Anderson Mesa || LONEOS || FLO || align=right | 1.7 km || 
|-id=999 bgcolor=#E9E9E9
| 31999 ||  || — || April 29, 2000 || Socorro || LINEAR || — || align=right | 3.5 km || 
|-id=000 bgcolor=#fefefe
| 32000 ||  || — || April 29, 2000 || Socorro || LINEAR || — || align=right | 3.2 km || 
|}

References

External links 
 Discovery Circumstances: Numbered Minor Planets (30001)–(35000) (IAU Minor Planet Center)

0031